= Ozymandias (Breaking Bad) =

- Breaking Bad episode
- Walter lies in anguish, echoing both the "half-sunk shattered visage" from Percy Shelley's poem and Gus's reaction to Max's death. (Note: Johnson has said that allusions to Max's death may have been deliberate on Walley-Beckett's part, but not his.)
- Episode no.: Season 5 Episode 14
- Directed by: Rian Johnson
- Written by: Moira Walley-Beckett
- Cinematography by: Michael Slovis
- Editing by: Skip Macdonald
- Original air date: September 15, 2013
- Running time: 47 minutes

Guest appearances
- Steven Michael Quezada as Steven Gomez; Michael Bowen as Jack Welker; Kevin Rankin as Kenny; Noah Segan as Fireman

Episode chronology
← Previous "To'hajiilee"	Next → "Granite State"
- Breaking Bad season 5

"Ozymandias" is the fourteenth episode of the fifth season of the American television drama series Breaking Bad, and the 60th episode of the series overall. Written by Moira Walley-Beckett and directed by Rian Johnson, it aired on AMC in the United States and Canada on September 15, 2013. The episode's narrative concludes the previous episode's cliffhanger.

Beckett and Johnson had previously worked together on the season three episode "Fly" and had a friendly working relationship that lasted throughout the production. Beckett was allowed greater creative freedom than she had experienced before. Owing to the intensity of the episode's storyline, the production was emotionally difficult for those involved. The episode was subject to much analysis following its release. Focus was given to the episode's parallels to its namesake, Percy Shelley's "Ozymandias"; its depiction of redemption; and Walt's (Bryan Cranston) phone call to Skyler (Anna Gunn).

"Ozymandias" has been universally acclaimed since its initial airing and is widely considered to be Breaking Bad's finest episode as well as one of the greatest television episodes of all time. Critics praised its writing, acting, direction, and payoff of storylines set up since "Pilot". At the 66th Primetime Emmy Awards, Walley-Beckett won Outstanding Writing for a Drama Series for her teleplay; Cranston and Gunn won Lead Actor and Supporting Actress respectively for their performances in the episode. In 2024, Rolling Stone ranked the episode first overall in their list of the 100 best TV episodes of all time. It was the only episode to have an aggregate 10/10 rating on IMDb before losing it to a review bombing campaign in 2026.

== Plot ==
In a flashback, Walter White and Jesse Pinkman conduct their first meth cook. (Note: Set during the pilot episode) Walt calls a pregnant Skyler White with an excuse for not being home, and she suggests the name Holly for their baby.

In the present, Hank Schrader is wounded following the shootout with Jack's brotherhood, and Steve Gomez has been killed. (Note: As depicted in "To'hajiilee") Jack prepares to kill Hank but Walt begs Jack to spare him, offering his entire fortune in exchange. Hank chides Walt for not realizing Jack has already decided to kill him. Jack shoots Hank dead, and Walt collapses to the ground in despair.

The gang discovers Walt's seven money barrels, but Jack tells Walt they will leave one for him because of Todd's respect for Walt. They bury Hank and Gomez in place of the barrels. Walt identifies Jesse's hiding place and demands Jack carry out the hit he requested. Todd suggests taking Jesse captive to learn what he revealed to Hank and Steve. Walt consents, and spitefully tells Jesse he watched Jane Margolis die. (Note: As depicted in "Phoenix") The gang then takes Jesse to their compound where he is imprisoned and forced to cook meth.

Walt's car runs out of fuel because a bullet pierced the fuel tank, so he rolls his barrel through the desert until he passes a house and buys the owner's truck. Unaware of what transpired in the desert, Marie Schrader informs Skyler that Hank has arrested Walt and demands that Skyler tell Walter White Jr. the truth. Skyler informs Walter Jr. about Walt's drug business, and he tells her she is as bad as Walt for going along. After arriving home, Skyler finds Walt frantically packing and he tries to get Skyler and Walter Jr. to leave with him. Skyler realizes Hank is dead, and believing Walt to be responsible, attacks him with a kitchen knife. A violent fight occurs and Walter Jr. tackles Walt, then calls the police. Walt kidnaps Holly and flees.

Marie and the police arrive at the Whites' home. Knowing police are monitoring the phone, Walt calls and attempts to establish Skyler's innocence by berating her and falsely claiming he built his drug business alone. Walt confirms Hank's death and leaves Holly at a fire station with her home address written on a note. The next morning, Walt meets Ed Galbraith, Saul Goodman's new-identity contact, who drives away with Walt and the money barrel.

== Production ==
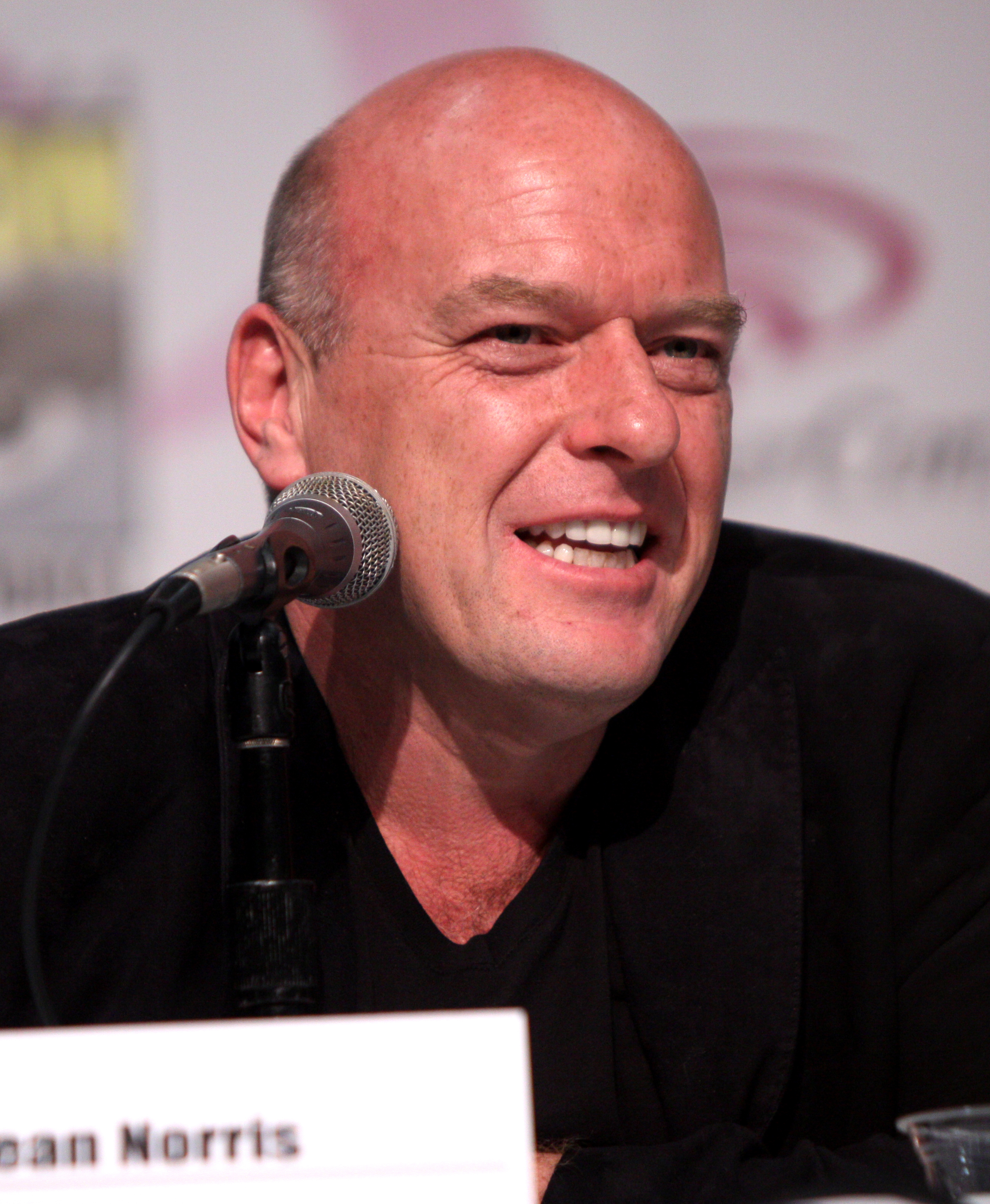
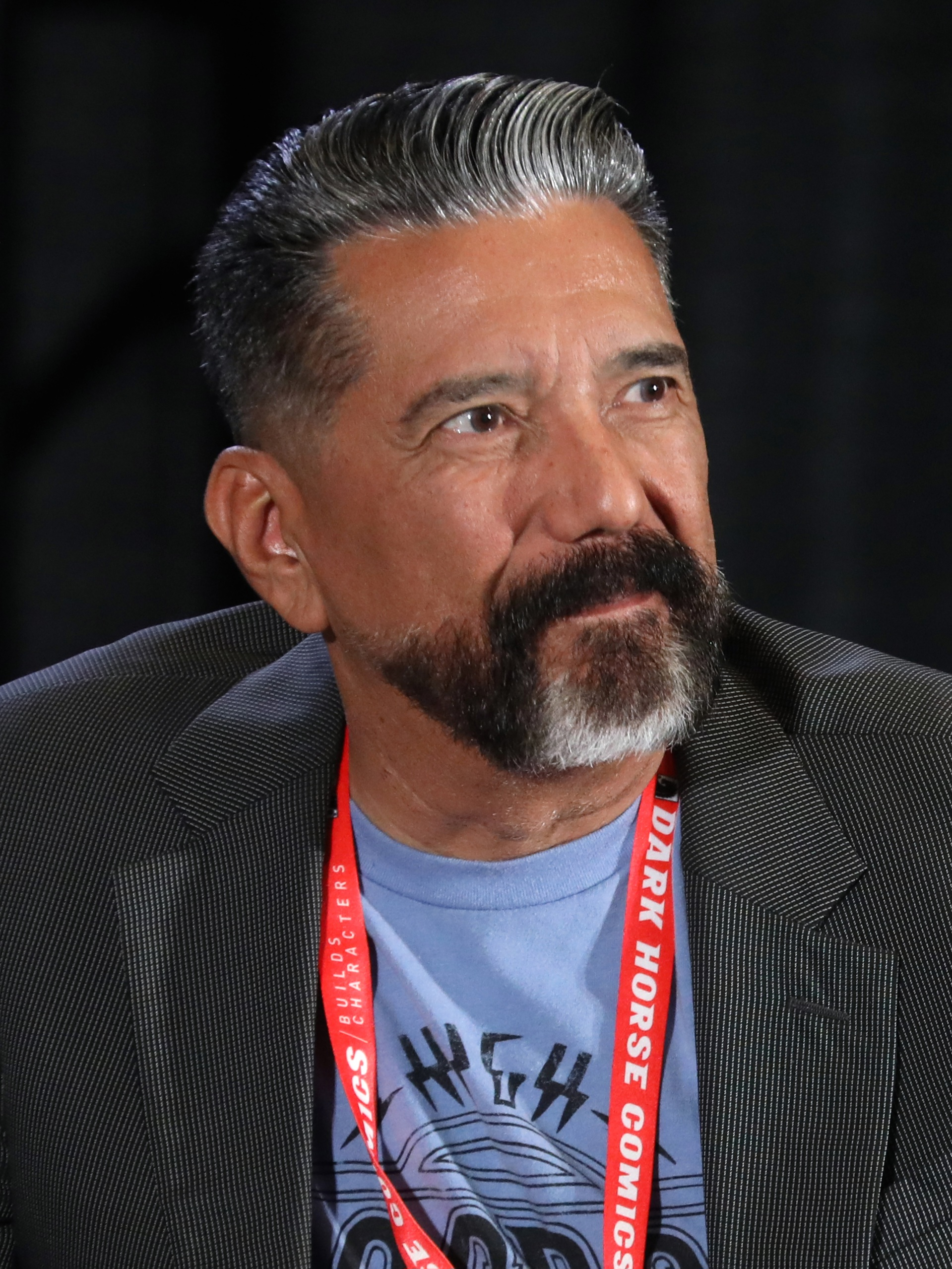
Dean Norris (left) and Steven Michael Quezada (right) made their final in-person appearance in Breaking Bad in "Ozymandias".

The episode was written by Moira Walley-Beckett and directed by Rian Johnson—self-described "partners in crime". As the writers are chosen in advance of the plot points being formed, Walley-Beckett's appointment was, in her own words, "luck of the draw". She requested to work with Johnson because of their experiences together working on the third-season episode "Fly". The two worked together throughout the production with them overseeing the final cut, a first for Walley-Beckett. Ultimately, Johnson said that the episode was Walley-Beckett's, who found herself deeply proud of the episode. Series creator Vince Gilligan was also enamored, thinking of it as the show's best. It aired on AMC in the United States and Canada on September 15, 2013.

This episode marks the final appearance of Hank Schrader (Dean Norris) and Steve Gomez (Steven Michael Quezada), though both would reprise their roles in season 5 of the prequel series Better Call Saul. Hank's death was shot in a minimal number of takes, due in part to the limited time the crew had and the inconvenient weather present. Although the writers discussed many options for his death, it was agreed, from the start of talks, that his death would be dignified and honorable; Hank was originally supposed to die at the end of the previous episode, but it was moved to "Ozymandias" for better pacing. To preserve the drama of Hank's death, the show's producers secured special permission from Hollywood guilds to delay showing the opening credits until 19 minutes into the episode.

The opening flashback scene was the last scene to be shot for the entire series. The crew waited to film the episode to allow for Bryan Cranston's and Aaron Paul's hair to grow in so they would look like they did before Walt began shaving his head and Jesse began wearing his hair short. Although it was filmed months after the rest of the episode, Johnson was able to return to direct the scene.

The shot depicting Walt's reaction to Hank's death was, according to Beckett, Johnson's invention. To emphasize the physical impact, he requested that puzzle pieces be placed on the ground, covered in dirt; the pieces were controlled by a trigger and disassembled upon the moment Walt landed, thus emulating the effect of "shattering the earth". The ground shots of Hank and Jesse required a special crane rig and "periscope lens". For the following shot of Walt rolling the barrel, Johnson wanted to emulate the stature of a dung beetle. To do so he got the "longest possible lens" they could afford and sent "the B-camera crew out in a truck way the hell out". Jesse's torture was left off-screen owing to the script excluding it and Johnson feeling that it would be unfair to the audience to manipulate their emotional investment in Jesse's character.

Betsy Brandt said that during production she avoided reading Hank's death, as she found it too emotional. Brandt noted that seven years after airing, she had not seen the episode. Co-executive producer Melissa Bernstein described reading the script as an "intense experience". Anna Gunn recalled that during the scene of Holly's kidnapping there were what "seemed like" a hundred onlookers. This coupled with the shooting running late and the erratic weather of the day led to her feeling under pressure and seeking support from Johnson. In 2014, she named it the hardest scene she filmed but also one of the "richest".

Walley-Beckett said that Walt's preceding confrontation was "extremely complicated" to write owing to the characters' differing objectives, the scene's "operatic" nature, and the multiple "crescendos and decrescendos". Johnson—who had it all "mapped out"—saw the scene as the hardest to film, noting that the line "I tried to save him" underwent multiple takes until Cranston commented that Walt should be, instead of bumbling, exasperated. Cranston and Gunn both performed the stunts themselves, barring two shots. The scene in which Walt is changing Holly's diaper had no lines for Holly in the script, but as Johnson explains: "[t]hat baby's mom was just off camera" which caused the baby to say "mama". Cranston stayed in character and went along with it, and it ended up in the episode.

== Analysis ==
The University of Colorado Boulder's Amanda Knopf noted that the shootout aligns with the conventional Western trope of improbable success in a gunfight and is an example of Walt's moral code and belief that dying in this manner would restore his masculinity and heroism. Walt is throughout the episode emasculated, in various ways. She also notes that, within the series, the desert is visually unique in that despite the destruction and loss taking place it remains "unchanged".

The lyrics to "Take My True Love by the Hand" by The Limeliters references and foreshadows Walt's isolation from his family, emphasized by Holly's first words being "Mama".

=== Parallels to Percy Shelley's Ozymandias ===
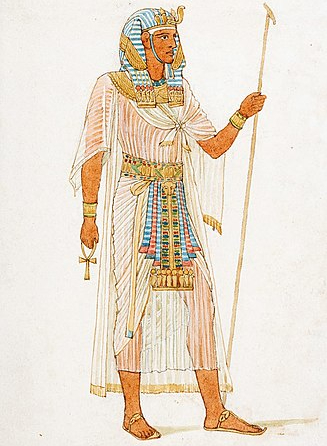
Ramesses II—the basis for Shelley's Ozymandias—whose poetic downfall is paralleled in Walt's

The episode title refers to the poem "Ozymandias" by Percy Bysshe Shelley, which recounts the crumbling legacy of a once-proud king. Bryan Cranston recited the entire poem in a 2013 trailer for the series. Walley-Beckett had wanted to use the poem for a long time and thus introduced it to showrunner Vince Gilligan.

Although the episode makes no explicit references to the poem, Austin Gill of Xavier University felt that by this episode's point in Walt's progression he had embodied the "tyrannical aspirations of invincibility and arrogance" of the poem's pharaoh, whose downfall is paralleled in Walt's. Douglas Eric Rasmussen of the University of Saskatchewan said that Walt's reaction to Hank's death indicates that he has become the "colossal wreck" of the poem—the empire of Ramesses II, which Shelley alluded to.

Further parallels are seen in both the episode and poem concluding with their protagonists left with little to show for their actions and how the "concept of hubris and being punished for grandiose projects that serve an individual's egotism are central aspects of each work". Walt's pant-less appearance in the flashback echoes the line "Two vast and trunk-less legs of stone". By evoking the poem, Rasmussen said, the show is critiquing Walt's empire and his "empty desires"—which he sees Walt embodying. Gill said that the episode—and by extension, the show—uses the poem to "underscore and warn of the ramifications of vanity" and "sustain cultural life and power".

=== Redemption ===
Donna Bowman of The A.V. Club said the episode portrayed "Walt at his most human [and] most deluded... Hank [is] transformed by his pursuit of Heisenberg into the lawman he always wanted to be". She concluded that Holly's kidnapping was the final straw for Walt's humanity. Alberto Nahum García Martínez and colleagues provided a reading which said that Walt's actions before and, particularly, after "Ozymandias" indicate moral redemption with the intention of the audience once again supporting Walt; in a review for Slate, published the same day as the episode, Matthew Yglesias speculated this to be the writers' goal.

When asked if the writers were trying to get the audience to support Walt, Walley-Beckett responded opaquely, noting that "moral ambiguity is a cornerstone of the series" and that they always "tried to legitimately confound expectations and put people in the moral position of rooting for somebody who's become a cancer to himself and everyone around [him]". Cranston said that the episode "[twisted] the allegiance, testing the audience" and that many people told him, following Walt disclosing his involvement in Jane's death, that they lost faith in Walt.

=== Phone call ===
The most analyzed and immediately discussed aspect of the episode was the phone call between Walt and Skyler—some viewers felt Walter's rage was false in an attempt to aid Skyler in avoiding prosecution; others saw his anger as genuine. Walley-Beckett "personally [felt] like it wasn't open to interpretation" and hoped that audiences would view it as a ploy and thus sympathize with Skyler, who Johnson framed in a deliberately intimate manner. She did see some of Walt's words as true. In an article for IndieWire, one week after the episode's airing, Sam Adams said that "most everyone agrees that Walt's call to Skyler was...[him] trying to exonerate her".

The University of British Columbia's Brandon Taylor said that the episode's critique of Walt is, by proxy, a critique of the audience for having, beforehand, derived pleasure from witnessing his actions. Drusilla Moorhouse, an online contributor to The Today Show's website, viewed the call as selfless and said it "rewrote the history of [Skyler's] complicity".

Matt Zoller Seitz of Vulture said that "The controversy over Walter's phone call is really about the relationship between viewers and television...It's about the discomfort that ensues when an episode or scene or moment forces us to take a hard look at why we watch a show, what we truly get out of it, and what that says about us". The New Yorker's Emily Nussbaum said that the episode "trolled" her—"the Prissy Progressive Fan"—and the "bad fans"—those who watch the show for a power fantasy. According to Nussbaum, the episode sought to critique the respective fans' views of Skyler as either "pure victim" or "bitch".

== Reception ==
=== Critical response ===
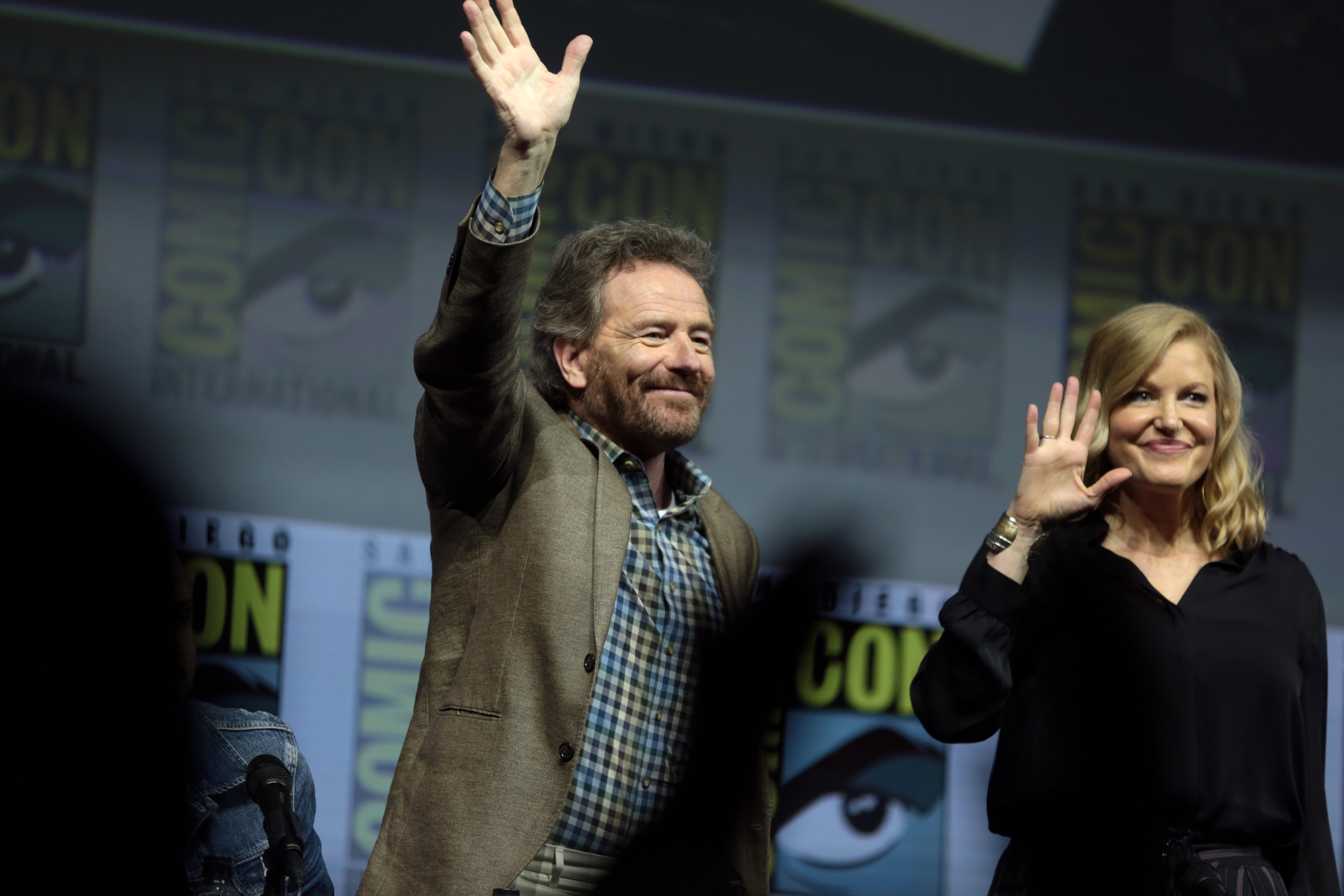
Bryan Cranston and Anna Gunn received acclaim and won Primetime Emmy Awards for their performances in "Ozymandias".

"Ozymandias" received universal critical acclaim, and is widely considered not only the show's best episode but also one of the best episodes in the history of television. Many publications named it the best television episode of 2013; (Note: Year-end lists include those by Digital Spy, Entertainment Weekly, IndieWire, Time, and Vulture.) some named it the best of the decade. (Note: Salon and USA Today named it as one of the best TV episodes of the decade; Variety 4th; The Ringer 10th.) TV Guide picked "Ozymandias" as the best television episode of the 21st century. Rolling Stone listed it as the best television episode of all time. "Ozymandias" frequently tops polls of the best Breaking Bad episodes. (Note: Such as those by Complex, IGN, IndieWire, Paste, The Ringer, Uproxx and Vulture) The episode, watched by 6.4 million viewers—the then-most for the show—is revered among fans, achieving a perfect 10.0 out of 10 rating on IMDb with over 200,000 votes, putting it at the number one spot for its 'Best TV Episodes' ranking. It was the only episode to have a perfect rating for over thirteen years.

Tom Mendelsohn of The Independent praised how the episode paid off the season's build-up. Seth Amitin of IGN echoed similar sentiments. The Los Angeles Times' Emily St. James described it as "rich" and gave particular praise to how it made Skyler's arc as a victim to willing accomplice "worth it", which she felt had previously been a fault of the season. IndieWire's Kevin Jagernauth complimented how the episode delivered on each member of the White family's arcs. Maureen Ryan of The Huffington Post commended how it actualized the consequences of Walt's actions, in what she saw as a visceral manner. Tyler Hersko, in an article for IndieWire, applauded how it was a "culmination" of the show to that point.

Some reviewers found it hard to watch. Ryan, although calling the episode "perfectly realized," said it left her feeling sick and made her cry. Tim Surette of TV.com called the episode "terrific and awful to watch; a powerful piece of television that transcended fiction". Linda Holmes, in a positive review of the episode, expressed relief that the show was ending, as she began to find "the show's honesty about greed and violence...unbearable".

Walley-Beckett's script and Johnson's direction were described by St. James as "beautiful" and "exquisite", respectively. Regular contributor to Paste, Ross Bonaime found Johnson's direction immersive, a sentiment echoed by Bowman. Jagernauth was grateful that Johnson "[served] the script by keeping the stylization at a minimum and letting the emotional scenes carry through with the power that was clearly on the page". Dustin Rowles called Johnson, in a 2014 article for Uproxx, the best working director in television directly because of his work on "Ozymandias".

Alex Berenson of Esquire provided limited criticism regarding Todd's request to spare Walt and his delay—noting the latter to be "heavy-handed and unsubtle" but acknowledging that it did work within the story. St. James called Jesse's survival "improbable". Yglesias found Walt revealing his entire fortune and his eventual new life to be out-of-character decisions; the gang's imprisonment of Jesse to continue selling meth and lack of in-fighting also perplexed him.

=== Accolades ===
At the 66th Primetime Emmy Awards, Moira Walley-Beckett won Outstanding Writing for a Drama Series for this episode. Bryan Cranston and Anna Gunn both submitted this episode for consideration after being nominated for Outstanding Lead Actor in a Drama Series and Outstanding Supporting Actress in a Drama Series, with each winning in their respective categories. Additionally, Tarra D. Day and Corey Welk were nominated for Outstanding Makeup for a Single-Camera Series (Non-Prosthetic).

=== 2026 review bombing ===
In February 2026, "Ozymandias" lost its perfect rating on IMDb following a review bombing campaign following purposeful 1 out of 10 reviews of A Knight of the Seven Kingdoms episode "In the Name of the Mother", to which "Ozymandias" was subsequently review bombed also. Following the review bombings to both episodes, the Six Feet Under episode "Everyone's Waiting" replaced "Ozymandias" as IMDb's highest rated television episode.

== See also ==
- List of television episodes listed among the best
