= Box Cutter (Breaking Bad) =

- Breaking Bad episode
- Gus slits Victor's throat with Gale's boxcutter.
- Episode no.: Season 4 Episode 1
- Directed by: Adam Bernstein
- Written by: Vince Gilligan
- Cinematography by: Michael Slovis
- Editing by: Skip Macdonald
- Original air date: July 17, 2011
- Running time: 47 minutes

Guest appearances
- David Costabile as Gale Boetticher; Jeremiah Bitsui as Victor; Lavell Crawford as Huell Babineaux; Tina Parker as Francesca Liddy

Episode chronology
← Previous "Full Measure"	Next → "Thirty-Eight Snub"
- Breaking Bad season 4

"Box Cutter" is the fourth season premiere of the American television drama series Breaking Bad, and its 34th episode overall. Written by series creator Vince Gilligan and directed by Adam Bernstein, "Box Cutter" originally aired on AMC in the United States on July 17, 2011. The narrative follows protagonist Walter White (Bryan Cranston) and his partner Jesse Pinkman (Aaron Paul) as they face repercussions from drug kingpin Gus Fring (Giancarlo Esposito) for killing Gale Boetticher at the end of the previous season. Meanwhile, Skyler White (Anna Gunn) breaks into her husband Walter's condominium to investigate his sudden disappearance, and Marie Schrader (Betsy Brandt) struggles to help Hank Schrader (Dean Norris) recover from his injuries.

The episode marked the final regular performances of actors David Costabile and Jeremiah Bitsui as Gale and Victor. Gilligan considered changing the episode based on audience responses to the third-season finale, "Full Measure", on whether Gale would be killed or not, but ultimately decided against it. During a twist scene in "Box Cutter", Gus slices his loyal henchman Victor's throat with Gale's utility knife right before Walt and Jesse's eyes. Esposito said he was concerned about filming the scene "without really hurting my spirit and my soul", and he concentrated so hard that he remained silent and focused during filming, rarely speaking to others on set. The scene was so bloody it made Cranston's daughter faint during a screening.

A major theme of "Box Cutter", and the entire fourth season, involved Walter's gradual change into a darker character who becomes more proactively violent and dangerous. The episode also illustrates Jesse's moral decline and feelings of guilt over his killing of Gale, and Skyler's growing involvement in Walter's illegal activities. The episode was watched by 2.58 million households according to Nielsen Media Research. Until the fifth-season premiere, "Box Cutter" was the most watched Breaking Bad episode in the series' history and the third-highest-rated season premiere for any AMC show, after the first two seasons' premieres of The Walking Dead. In 2012, Gilligan won the Writers Guild of America Award for Best Episodic Drama for his work on this episode.

== Plot ==
In a flashback, (Note: During the events of "Mandala".) methamphetamine manufacturer Gale Boetticher excitedly sets up equipment in an underground meth superlab for Gus Fring. Gale asks Gus about the blue meth being produced by chemist Walter White. Gus explains he has reservations about hiring Walt, but Gale insists Gus hire him because of his superior product.

In the present, following Walt's order, Jesse Pinkman has killed Gale (Note: As seen in "Full Measure".) to foil Gus' plot to kill them. Gus' henchman Victor arrives at Gale's apartment and finds him dead, surrounded by neighbors who have called the police. Victor finds Jesse sitting in his car and forces him to return to the lab, where Mike Ehrmantraut is holding Walt. Mike is concerned that Victor was seen at Gale's apartment and calls to inform Gus. Victor realizes his own position is precarious and reveals he observed Walt and Jesse's work by starting to cook meth himself.

Skyler White observes Walt's car in her driveway and moves it a few blocks away so Walter White Jr. will not see it. She calls Saul Goodman to ask where Walt is, but Saul is paranoid because of Walt's falling out with Gus and is busy checking his office for listening devices. Skyler breaks into Walt's condominium with the aid of a locksmith but finds little of interest. Marie Schrader struggles to maintain her composure while caring for a belligerent Hank Schrader, who is still bedridden after the attempt on his life. (Note: As seen in "One Minute.")

Gus arrives at the lab but says nothing. Walt launches into a rambling monologue, hoping to convince Gus he needs him and Jesse alive. Gus maintains his silence while changing into hazmat gear and picking up the box cutter Gale used during the lab setup. He startles everyone by slicing Victor's throat, then coldly eyes Walt and Jesse. He quietly returns to his street clothes, then walks out, pausing only to say, "Get back to work."

Walt and Jesse use hydrofluoric acid to dispose of Victor's body, the gun that killed Gale, and the box cutter. During breakfast, Walt insists Gale's death was necessary, but expresses concern that Gus will kill them at his next opportunity. Jesse believes it will be too much trouble for Gus to find another drug manufacturer, though Gus might make them wish they were dead. Police investigate Gale's apartment with his lab notebook sitting out in the open.

== Production ==
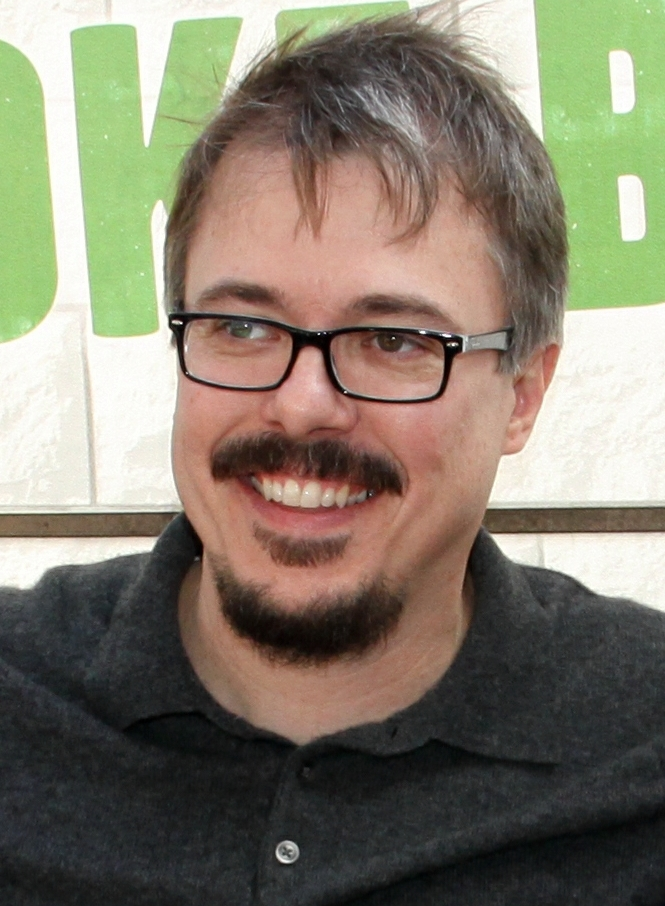
"Box Cutter" was written by Breaking Bad creator Vince Gilligan.

"Box Cutter", the fourth season premiere of Breaking Bad, was directed by Adam Bernstein and written by series creator Vince Gilligan. Filmed in January 2011, the episode was edited by Skip Macdonald, one of a handful of editors who have regularly worked on the series. It was broadcast on July 17, 2011, and was the first original Breaking Bad episode in 13 months, since the third season finale episode "Full Measure" aired in June 2010. AMC officials delayed the fourth-season premiere until July because they felt the Nielsen ratings would be better during the summer. While Breaking Bad scripts are generally 50 pages long, the screenplay to "Box Cutter" was 43 pages long, and Gilligan was originally concerned because he did not want to stretch out the episode simply to pad the running time. "Full Measure" ended with Jesse's pulling a gun on Gale and firing directly into the screen, with Gale's death not visibly revealed on-screen. This led to wide speculation among fans and reviewers that Jesse did not actually kill Gale, but rather aimed away from him and fired the gun. This speculation continued up until the original broadcast of "Box Cutter", which confirmed Jesse indeed killed Gale. Gilligan said he never intended for that scene to be a cliffhanger and he thought it clearly conveyed that Gale had died.

"Box Cutter" featured the final regular appearances of recurring Breaking Bad actors David Costabile and Jeremiah Bitsui who, respectively, played Gale Boetticher and Victor. Stand-up comedian Lavell Crawford also made his first of several guest appearances in "Box Cutter" as Huell, Saul's new bodyguard. Gilligan stated that he named the episode "Box Cutter" mainly because "it just sounded like a cool title", but also because he was concerned that the climax of the episode took so long to build to that, by calling it "Box Cutter", "Perhaps I was thinking on some level, 'We'd better let the audience know that there's something at the end of this.'" Although the Breaking Bad staff always intended for Gale to be killed, the audience reaction to "Full Measure" made Gilligan and the Breaking Bad writing staff reconsider whether their plans were the best ones. However, Gilligan said they instead decided to follow their original plan, saying "At the end of the day, the choice we made for how to press forward was the choice we felt was the most honest, and the one that would best continue the story."

I found how I could not scar myself was by understanding completely that Gus was doing something to protect the family. These chemists that he's cultivated, the people that work for him, bodyguards, and everyone else, the people in the laundry, the people in the chicken place — he cares about them. So in order to protect them, he has to do this thing, because this person has been exposed, and he's gotta take care of business to protect the family.

— Giancarlo Esposito

Giancarlo Esposito said that when he first read the script for "Box Cutter", he was so shocked that he had to put it down and walk away from it. Esposito said he did not want to "take any of [the scene] home with me" and had "some deep concern about being able to do it and coming out of it unscathed, without really hurting my spirit and my soul". He worked through these concerns by justifying Gus' actions in that, by killing Victor, he was protecting everyone else who works for him. Nevertheless, he said it was "a difficult moment for me" to slit Victor's throat, and that during one take he tried to hush the character to make him die more calmly. That scene took two days to film, and Esposito remained silent and focused during filming, rarely speaking to the others on set. The boots he was originally given were too large and he was concerned that he would slip, which would be out of character for Gus, who was otherwise completely calm and in control. A costume designer quickly procured the right-sized boots for him.

In writing the script, the Breaking Bad staff decided early on that Gus would not speak much during the scene because they felt it was more dramatic that way and more appropriate for his character. Esposito felt the scene was a pivotal moment not only for his character, but for Gus' relationship with Walter, and a warning that Walter should continue to operate Gus' way or risk death. Regarding his character's murder of Victor, Esposito said: "This had to be done. Someone did something, they got seen. ... It was about survival. This had to be done, but I could do it in a way that also sent a message to the people who weren't listening." Bryan Cranston said he was not expecting the episode to take the direction it did. He called the scene "painful, but beautifully crafted, and reasonably so", and commented on the contrast between Gus' calm demeanor and Walter's "tap-dancing to stay alive". Cranston said of Esposito's performance, "When he plays that bad character, his eyes go dead, and all it takes is to look into his eyes." Gilligan said although Gus' actions in the scene were scripted, "You'd be surprised how little I talked to Giancarlo about how he played that part ... This is a man with amazing instincts."

Jeremiah Bitsui sprained his ankle during filming of the scene when Walter and Jesse shoved his character's corpse into a barrel to dispose of it with hydrofluoric acid. Following that scene, Jesse lifts the barrel with a forklift and it is lit in a way that the barrel can be seen through. This was accomplished by back-lighting the barrel and tying monofilament to the bottom of it, which staff members then moved and twisted outside of the view of the camera to create the lighting effect.

== Analysis ==
A major theme of "Box Cutter" involves Walter's gradual change from an unwitting participant in a drug-dealing enterprise into a man more comfortable with a life of crime who embraces his darker side and becomes more proactively violent and dangerous. This development began during the latter episodes of the third season and would continue to be a major theme throughout the fourth season. The episode also introduced the ongoing theme of Jesse's moral decline and self guilt over his killing of Gale. Aaron Paul said of this, "Jesse's much more raw this season. He's very distant, and he's turned to just utter chaos and destruction to keep his mind busy. When he's left alone in his own thoughts, that's when things can get kind of dangerous and scary for Jesse."

The scene when Walter pleads with Gus demonstrates the paternal sense of protectiveness Walter has developed for Jesse. During that scene, Walter tells Gus, "You kill me, you have nothing. You kill Jesse, you don't have me." Jesse is visibly moved by the statement, which Aaron Paul described as "the first moment that Jesse realizes that Walt's loyalty is to Jesse." "Box Cutter" also illustrated Skyler's growing involvement in Walter's illegal activities through the subplot in which she lies to a locksmith to break into Walter's house, going so far as to use her baby as a prop in her facade. After Skyler breaks into Walter's apartment, she finds the plastic eyeball of a teddy bear that has been part of the series since the second season. The eye has long been used as a symbol to identify Walter's gradual descent into a life of crime, and Skyler's discovery of it symbolizes her own similar descent.

=== Cultural references ===
During a scene when Gale's neighbor calls police to report his murder, a clock in Gale's apartment reads 10:13. This is a deliberate reference to the number 1013, which frequently appeared in The X-Files, where Vince Gilligan worked as a writer and producer and Bryan Cranston as an actor. It refers to the name of X-Files creator Chris Carter's production company Ten Thirteen Productions, which in turn is a reference to Chris Carter's birthday, October 13. A copy of Everything's Eventual, a collection of short stories by Stephen King, can be seen in Gale's apartment. After Walter and Jesse are released by Gus, they eat lunch at Denny's, a coffee shop and family restaurant chain. During this scene, they are wearing matching T-shirts with country music singer Kenny Rogers on them. The T-shirts are deliberately not explained in the episode, but Vince Gilligan said he believed Mike simply bought the first articles of clean clothing he could find for Walter and Jesse after their clothes were soaked with Victor's blood. During the final scene of "Box Cutter", when Walter walks back to his car, the Alex Ebert song "Truth" plays in the background.

== Reception ==
=== Initial screening and ratings ===
"Box Cutter" was first publicly shown on June 28, 2011, at the Grauman's Chinese Theatre in Hollywood. During the scene when Gus killed Victor, Bryan Cranston's seventeen year-old daughter Taylor fainted in her seat inside the theater at the sight of all the blood. This prompted theater officials to briefly interrupt the screening and ask for a doctor in the audience, causing a brief panic among the crowd. The violent scenes in "Box Cutter" proved so bloody that AMC included a disclaimer warning about the violence at the start of the episode and after the commercial break halfway through the episode.

In its original American broadcast, "Box Cutter" was seen by an estimated 2.58 million household viewers, according to Nielsen Media Research. It was the most watched Breaking Bad episode in the series and the second highest rated season premiere for any AMC show, falling behind only the series premiere of The Walking Dead, which drew 5.3 million household viewers. It was also a 32 percent increase in viewership compared to the third-season premiere, "No Más". "Box Cutter" performed especially strong with men between ages 18 and 34, among whom viewership was up 67 percent compared to the third-season premiere. The episode was seen by 1.4 million household viewers in both the 18 to 49 and the 25 to 54 age groups, a 21 percent increase in the former group and a 26 percent increase in the latter.

=== Reviews ===
"Box Cutter" is everything a Breaking Bad episode should be. While it might not have been as explosive as the finale or "Half Measure", it played on all of the show's strengths, building tension effortlessly, while bringing out the high caliber acting and cinematography we've come to know. With the seasons official tagline being: "Warning: Highly Volatile", it's hard to keep patient as we have to wait each week for Walter White's next move, and perhaps his full evolution into a ruthless crime lord.

— Brent Koepp, Paste magazine

Alan Sepinwall of HitFix said the episode demonstrated how effective the creators of Breaking Bad are at manipulating the emotions of their viewers. Sepinwall described the story as "remarkably simple" but the execution as extremely effective, and he called the amount of screen time dedicated to Gus calmly changing his clothes before and after killing Victor "a move so ballsy and so brilliant I actually started giggling the second time they did it". Time magazine writer James Poniewozik said the episode demonstrated how effective Breaking Bad can be even with a minimal amount of dialogue, such as Gus' silence during his scene in the lab, and Jesse's wordlessness throughout the episode as he processed what he had done to Gale. He also praised the color scheme of the blood-red meth lab as an illustrator of Walter and Jesse's descent into hell. Entertainment Weekly writer Ken Tucker said of the episode, "Its eloquent silences, its breath-taking pictorial compositions ... these are pleasures that transcend 98% of television's usual attempts at dirty realism or fashionable pessimism". Kim Potts of TV Squad called Gus' killing of Victor "one of the more jarring scenes in Breaking Bad history". The Faster Times writer Craig McQuinn called it "one of the most intense episodes I've ever seen", and said it solidified Gus' standing as "one of the greatest TV antagonists I've ever seen". Matt Zoller Seitz of Salon.com compared the filmmaking in "Box Cutter" to that of works by Alfred Hitchcock and the Coen brothers, and called the best example of television's ability to "take an elastic approach to narrative and let certain incidents or moments expand to fill up most or all of an episode" since "The Suitcase", an episode of the television series Mad Men.

Seth Amitin of IGN called it a minimalist, deliberately paced episode, but said it was never boring due to the excellent acting, dialogue, and suspense which illustrates "just how quickly this show lost its innocence". He also said the subplots involving Skyler, Hank, and Marie kept the episode's pace well. Los Angeles Times writer Emily St. James praised the performance of Aaron Paul despite his almost complete lack of dialogue throughout the episode and felt the script raised interesting contrasts between Walt, who acts impulsively and rash while captured, and Gus, who seems calm and in control. However, she said it felt like Victor was killed rather than Walter or Jesse simply because the writers could not kill the two main protagonists. Michael Arbeiter of Hollywood.com called it a "great and intriguing way to start the season" and particularly praised Aaron Paul, who he said was "phenomenal" despite barely speaking any dialogue in the episode. However, he had "mixed feelings" about the Gus character's evolution from a behind-the-scenes criminal to a hands-on killer. Jessica Johnson of Time Out Chicago called it an "exquisite exercise in tension" that builds a "slow crescendo of what looks to be an impressively strong season". Andy Vineberg of the Bucks County Courier Times called it "a great start for a show that just keeps getting better". He praised the dark humor that kept the tension of the show balanced and particularly complimented the pre-credits scene and the ramifications it had for the show and its characters. RedEye writer Curt Wagner found that the cinematography, pacing and tension were so effective in "Box Cutter", that "I think I broke a sweat just watching". Paste magazine writer Brent Koepp praised the transformation of Walter, and said few other shows would risk making their protagonist so unlikeable. Koepp called the climactic scene with Gus "brilliant" and complimented the script for taking its time in building the tension.

Matt Richenthal of TV Fanatic praised the episode for its effectiveness in scenes featuring little dialogue, particularly with Jesse and Gus, claiming, "No show does silence like Breaking Bad." He also complimented Cranston's desperate monologue while trying to convince Gus not to kill him, claiming it provided a deep insight into Walt's character and his inability to accept responsibility for his actions. Zap2it writer Rick Porter called the scene with Gus killing Victor a "master class in building tension" due to the strong writing, direction and acting, particularly by Esposito. Scott Wampler of Collider.com called it "a fantastic, bloody, shocking season premiere, one of the best in the show's history". He particularly praised Esposito's performance and suggested it could make the actor worthy of contention for an Emmy Award. BlackBook magazine writer Chris Mohney strongly praised Esposito's performance, and described his silence and calm during the climactic scene as "one of the great recent moments of TV menace". June Thomas of Slate magazine called it a "fine opening episode" that did not advance the plot significantly but "served as an artful reminder of where the characters stand psychologically". Thomas said she believed the episode demonstrated that Walter is in fact a weak man, comparing his useless pleas to Gus to his ineffective attempts to mislead Skyler about his drug-manufacturing activities in earlier seasons. Not all reviews were positive. Jessica Grose, also of Slate, said while she prefers episodes that mixed its darker aspects with black humor, "Box Cutter" was "all claustrophobia and fear". The Philadelphia Inquirer columnist David Hiltbrand condemned the violent scene with Victor's death, which he called "totally gratuitous ... serv[ing] no plot or character purpose".

In 2019, The Ringer ranked "Box Cutter" as the 5th best out of the 62 total Breaking Bad episodes. Vulture ranked it 29th overall.
