= Breaking Bad season 3 =

Third season of the AMC crime drama television series

Breaking Bad
- Season 3
- DVD cover
- Showrunner: Vince Gilligan
- Starring: Bryan Cranston; Anna Gunn; Aaron Paul; Dean Norris; Betsy Brandt; RJ Mitte; Giancarlo Esposito; Bob Odenkirk; Jonathan Banks
- No. of episodes: 13

Release
- Original network: AMC
- Original release: March 21 – June 13, 2010

Season chronology
- ← Previous; Season 2 Next → Season 4

The third season of the American television drama series Breaking Bad premiered on March 21, 2010, and concluded on June 13, 2010. It consisted of 13 episodes, each running about 47 minutes. AMC broadcast the third season on Sundays at 10:00 pm in the United States. The complete third season was released on Region 1 DVD and Region A Blu-ray on June 7, 2011.

Season 3 saw actors Bob Odenkirk, Giancarlo Esposito and Jonathan Banks, who play Saul, Gus and Mike respectively, upgraded to main cast status after guest starring the previous season, although they are not credited for every episode until season 4.

== Cast ==
=== Main ===
- Bryan Cranston as Walter White, a terminally ill former high school chemistry teacher who is secretly cooking meth.
- Anna Gunn as Skyler White, Walt's wife who learns about Walt's criminal activity.
- Aaron Paul as Jesse Pinkman, Walt's former student who helps him cook.
- Dean Norris as Hank Schrader, Walt's brother-in-law who is a Drug Enforcement Administration (DEA) agent.
- Betsy Brandt as Marie Schrader, Skyler's sister, and Hank's wife.
- RJ Mitte as Walter White Jr., Walt and Skyler's teenaged son who has cerebral palsy.
- Giancarlo Esposito as Gus Fring, a drug kingpin who uses his restaurant, Los Pollos Hermanos, as a money laundering front.
- Bob Odenkirk as Saul Goodman, Walt's sleazy lawyer who helps him cover his tracks.
- Jonathan Banks as Mike Ehrmantraut, one of Gus' most loyal henchmen and one of Saul's associates.

=== Recurring ===
- Jeremiah Bitsui as Victor, one of Gus' henchmen.
- Daniel and Luis Moncada as Leonel and Marco Salamanca, twin brothers and Hector's nephews, who seek revenge for the death of their cousin Tuco.
- Steven Michael Quezada as Steven Gomez, Hank's partner at the DEA.
- Charles Baker as Skinny Pete, one of Jesse's friends.
- Christopher Cousins as Ted Beneke, Skyler's former boss who she has a brief affair with.
- David Costabile as Gale Boetticher, one of Gus' associates who briefly worked with Walt.
- Michael Shamus Wiles as ASAC George Merkert, the head of the Albuquerque DEA office, Hank and Steve's boss.
- Jere Burns as Group Leader, a counselor who helps recovering drug addicts, including Jesse.
- Matt L. Jones as Badger, one of Jesse's friends.
- Mark Margolis as Hector Salamanca, Leonel and Marco's uncle and Gus' arch nemesis.
- Javier Grajeda as Juan Bolsa, a high ranking cartel member.
- Emily Rios as Andrea Cantillo, a recovering addict who Jesse meets at group therapy.
- Carmen Serano as Principal Carmen Molina, the principal of J.P. Wynne High School, where Walter Jr. attends and where Walt works.

=== Guest ===
- John de Lancie as Donald Margolis, Jesse's former landlord who is still grieving over the death of his daughter, Jane.
- Larry Hankin as Old Joe, a junkyard owner who helps Walt and Jesse destroy the RV they cooked meth in.
- Tess Harper as Diane Pinkman, Jesse's mother.
- Tom Kiesche as Clovis, Badger's cousin.
- Tina Parker as Francesca Liddy, Saul's secretary.
- Krysten Ritter as Jane Margolis, Donald's deceased daughter, and Jesse's former girlfriend who appears in a flashback scene.
- Rodney Rush as Combo, Jesse's deceased friend who appears in a flashback scene.
- Marius Stan as Bogdan, Walt's former boss who owns a car wash that Walt wants to buy so he can launder his money.
- Danny Trejo as Tortuga, a cartel member who worked as an informant for the DEA, until he was killed by Leonel and Marco.

== Episodes ==
No. overall	No. in season	Title	Directed by	Written by	Original release date	U.S. viewers (millions)
21	1	"No Más"	Bryan Cranston	Vince Gilligan	March 21, 2010	1.95
All of Albuquerque is in shock in the aftermath of the mid-air plane collision. Walt is living in his home alone after Skyler has moved out with Walt Jr. and their newborn daughter Holly to give Walt time to pack his things. Skyler speaks to a divorce lawyer about making the split permanent, but wavers when the attorney says she should try to uncover any money Walt may have hidden. Later, Skyler presents Walt with divorce papers and accuses him of being a weed dealer; Walt admits that he cooks meth. Deeply shaken, Skyler storms off and states she will not expose Walt's secret if he grants her the divorce and full custody of their children. Jesse is in rehab trying to overcome his drug addiction, while struggling with his own personal self-loathing and guilt over Jane's death. Walt tells Gus that he is leaving the business, though he briefly considers Gus' very lucrative offer. Meanwhile, two dangerous-looking twin brothers cross into the US from Mexico in search of Heisenberg.
22	2	"Caballo sin Nombre"	Adam Bernstein	Peter Gould	March 28, 2010	1.55
Walt is having difficulty adjusting to his new life. He has an encounter with a police officer over a cracked windshield but manages to avoid charges, thanks to Hank's intervention. Skyler returns to work for Ted and continues to not let Walt return home, dismaying Walt Jr., who does not understand his mother's behavior. Saul wants Walt to start producing meth again, but he refuses; Saul calls Mike to stake out the Whites' house. Jesse stops by his old house and discovers that his parents have had it renovated and put it up for sale. As relations are still strained between them, Jesse approaches Saul to buy the house from his parents. Saul visits Jesse's parents and threatens to reveal that the house contained a meth lab. Frightened that this will entangle the house in legal action and make it sell for far less, Jesse's parents agree to Saul's cash offer. The twin brothers are revealed to be Tuco's cousins, Leonel and Marco Salamanca. They visit their uncle Hector, who is now living in a retirement home; Hector gives them Walt's name. After a disgruntled Walt breaks back into his home, the cousins arrive to kill him; an onlooking Mike gets Gus to call them off at the last minute.
23	3	"I.F.T."	Michelle MacLaren	George Mastras	April 4, 2010	1.33
Walt moves back into the house and tells Skyler he has no intention of leaving. Walt Jr. is thrilled that his father is back, but Skyler calls the police in an attempt to have Walt thrown out. The police are unable to intervene without a court order, and Skyler stops short of revealing Walt's illegal activities. Skyler meets with her attorney and admits that Walt is a meth distributor; her attorney advises her to divorce Walt and tell the police, but Skyler tearfully states that she does not want Walt Jr. to find out his father is a criminal. Jesse is still having trouble coming to terms with Jane's death but has moved back into his house. Unbeknownst to Walt, Gus arranges a meeting with Tuco's cousins and Hector, making it clear that he wants Walt left alone for the time being. After finding out that he is going to be transferred back to El Paso, Hank lashes out in a bar. Walt explains to Skyler that he committed all of his illegal activities for the sake of the family, and begs her to accept the drug money. Later, Skyler seduces Ted at work, and that night, she coolly informs Walt of her infidelity.
24	4	"Green Light"	Scott Winant	Sam Catlin	April 11, 2010	1.46
Jesse gives meth to a cashier in exchange for gasoline. Walt makes a scene at Skyler's workplace while confronting Ted, but Mike removes Walt before the police can arrive. Saul tries to convince Walt to continue producing meth, but Walt refuses the offer upon discovering that they bugged his house; he then fires Saul on the spot, thus losing Saul's help laundering money. Walt attempts to seduce the school principal, Carmen, but is promptly rebuffed and placed on indefinite leave. As he leaves, Walt is met by Jesse, who has produced a new batch of meth following Walt's recipe. Walt rejects Jesse's product as substandard, and Jesse resolves to sell the product to Gus himself, through Saul and Mike as the mediators. Gus reluctantly agrees to the purchase, anticipating that Walt's pride and financial need will convince him to accept his business proposition. Jesse makes the sale but receives only half the payment, while the second half is delivered to Walt. Hank forgoes his transfer to El Paso in order to pursue a new lead in the Heisenberg case, having found footage of Jesse's RV at the gas station.
25	5	"Más"	Johan Renck	Moira Walley-Beckett	April 18, 2010	1.61
Walt correctly deduces that Gus tried to lure him back into the business by giving him half of Jesse's sale, but still refuses to accept. Gus tries to convince him for a last time with a high-tech superlab. Walt is impressed, but nevertheless declines the offer, as the meth business has cost him his family; Gus proclaims that a man provides for his family regardless of whether or not his family appreciates him for it. Hank continues investigating the RV and has an argument with Marie. Concerned for Hank's well-being, Marie confides in Skyler, which in turn makes her doubt her new relationship with Ted. Skyler also begins to reconsider Walt's drug money and starts realizing that she might want to patch things up. When she returns home, Skyler is surprised to find the divorce contract signed by Walt and all of his belongings gone, including the money. At Saul's office, Walt gives the money to Jesse but reveals that he has decided to cook again, angering Jesse but exciting Saul. Hank finds a link between the RV and Jesse when he discovers it belonged to Combo's mother.
26	6	"Sunset"	John Shiban	John Shiban	April 25, 2010	1.64
Walt settles into a new apartment and takes a liking to his new, well-qualified lab assistant Gale, while Jesse enlists Badger and Skinny Pete to enter the drug trade alongside him again. In the wake of the divorce, Walt Jr. wants answers about his parents' relationship. Hank conducts surveillance on Jesse, believing that the RV is in his possession. Upon discovering that Hank has discovered Jesse's link to the RV, Walt immediately orders it destroyed. When Jesse angrily arrives, Hank follows him and corners them inside the RV, but is unaware of Walt's presence. They avoid capture by drawing Hank away with Saul's assistance, who has his secretary call Hank and claim that Marie was in an accident. Hank realizes the ruse only when he goes to the hospital, and Walt and Jesse nostalgically watch as the RV is destroyed. Gus, seeing that Tuco's two cousins definitely intend to kill Walt and cannot be held at bay for long, successfully turns their attention instead to Hank.
27	7	"One Minute"	Michelle MacLaren	Thomas Schnauz	May 2, 2010	1.52
Hank brutally attacks Jesse in retaliation for the incident at the impound lot. In the hospital, Jesse tells Saul and Walt that he will make Hank's life miserable and continue cooking, threatening to hand Walt to the DEA if he or Saul intervene. Skyler pressures Walt to convince Jesse to drop the charges against Hank. Walt engineers a fallout with Gale, and over Gus' objections, offers Jesse a chance to renew their partnership. At first, Jesse angrily refuses, but later relents. Hank tearfully reflects with Marie on how his professionalism has deteriorated since he killed Tuco and deduces that he is done being a cop. At the DEA office, Hank admits to assaulting Jesse, resulting in him being suspended without pay and having his gun confiscated. Later, Hank receives an anonymous call warning him he has one minute before he is attacked. Hank wonders if it is a prank call, but Tuco's cousins arrive and shoot him several times. Hank reverses his car into Leonel, pinning him against another car and maiming him from the waist down, then shoots Marco in the head with Leonel's gun.
28	8	"I See You"	Colin Bucksey	Gennifer Hutchison	May 9, 2010	1.78
Jesse is discharged from the hospital following Hank's attack on him and sees Hank being admitted in critical condition. The attempted hit on Hank prompts the Mexican government to crack down on the cartel and border security; Gus receives a call from drug lord Juan Bolsa, who intends to get the truth from Leonel as to who permitted them to act. Marie lashes out at Hank's boss when she hears they had taken his gun away, as well as at Walt, whom she blames for putting Jesse on Hank's radar. Walt fires Gale and replaces him with Jesse. While Walt is at the hospital, Jesse is left on his own in the lab and, unable to cook, becomes worried about meeting their quota. At the hospital, Walt sees Leonel recovering and realizes that he might have been their intended target. Gus decides to pay a visit to the hospital, and Walt learns that Gus has known that Hank is his brother-in-law. Minutes after Gus leaves, Leonel goes into cardiac arrest and dies; Mike surreptitiously drops an empty syringe into a sharps container and then leaves. During another phone call with Gus, Bolsa is suddenly shot in his home.
29	9	"Kafkaesque"	Michael Slovis	Peter Gould & George Mastras	May 16, 2010	1.61
Walt and Jesse are in full production in the new lab and easily producing their target 200 pounds of meth per week, while Jesse skims some of the excess to sell on his own with Badger and Skinny Pete. Marie is frustrated when she learns that their insurance will not provide the quality of physical therapy Hank requires to walk again. Skyler, certain that Walt is at least indirectly responsible for the attack on Hank, proposes that she and Walt pay the bills, spinning a tale about how Walt's gambling winnings have netted them an amount with seven figures. Marie is shocked but agrees to take their money. Hank's work partner Gomez shows Hank a map that indicates blue meth has been sold in seven states, confirming Hank's suspicions about Heisenberg still being active. When Hank reveals that he received a warning phone call, Walt realizes that the attackers were after him, and speculates that Gus deflected their attention onto Hank to protect him and corner the entire Southwest meth market with domestic production. Walt expresses gratitude towards Gus, who promises Walt security and brings up the possibility of extending their contract to a year.
30	10	"Fly"	Rian Johnson	Sam Catlin & Moira Walley-Beckett	May 23, 2010	1.20
Walt is suffering from insomnia, worried about the direction his life has taken. Unaware that Jesse has been skimming, he is also concerned that their yield is a half-pound short of his calculations. His paranoia comes to a head when he spots a small housefly in the lab, and, worried about contamination, goes to extreme lengths to kill it. Jesse, at first dismissive, begins to help as well, and when he finds out Walt has not slept in two days, slips sleeping pills into Walt's coffee. Walt tries to pinpoint the exact moment when things got out of control, and it becomes clear that the paranoia over contamination is not about the fly at all. Near delirium, Walt repeatedly refers to Jane and the night she died but stops short of telling Jesse what really happened. While Walt sleeps, Jesse cooks the batch on his own. In the parking lot the following morning, Walt refers to the missing half-pound of meth and warns Jesse that there may be hidden cameras in the lab and that he will not be able to protect Jesse if Gus finds out about the reason for the shortage.
31	11	"Abiquiu"	Michelle MacLaren	John Shiban & Thomas Schnauz	May 30, 2010	1.32
Skyler gets the first of Hank's hospital bills and, concerned that the money they use to pay them could be traced back to Walt's illegal activities, decides to get more involved in Walt's business affairs. Walt introduces her to Saul, but she is unimpressed by the investment Saul has lined up and suggests a more believable business investment: the car wash where Walt previously worked. At the hospital, Marie is thrilled at the prospect of Hank returning home, but he adamantly refuses to leave the hospital until he can walk. Gus invites Walt to dinner and dispenses sage advice. Jesse tries to peddle the meth he has been skimming at the lab and, fed up with Badger and Skinny Pete's reluctance to sell to their rehab group, decides to sell to Andrea, a new member at their NA meeting. He ends up in a relationship with her and refuses to sell her meth when he finds out she has a five-year-old son, Brock. Jesse also discovers that Andrea's 11-year-old brother Tomás was the child who shot Combo. Jesse visits the corner where Combo was killed and confirms Tomás is working for dealers who sell blue meth, suggesting their connection to Gus.
32	12	"Half Measures"	Adam Bernstein	Sam Catlin & Peter Gould	June 6, 2010	1.19
Jesse prepares to exact revenge against the drug dealers who killed Combo and wants Walt to help him out. Walt refuses, but realizing the danger Jesse has put himself in, takes steps to protect him. Hank is still reluctant to leave the hospital, even though his doctors have told him he is free to leave at any time. Nevertheless, Marie wheels Hank out of the hospital after betting she can arouse him during a sponge bath. Jesse is brought into a meeting with Gus, who promises his dealers will stop using children as pawns; Jesse reluctantly agrees to "keep the peace". That night, Jesse learns that the drug dealers have chosen to end Tomás's involvement in their activities by killing the boy, and he decides to kill the two dealers himself. Walt hears about the boy's death on TV and abruptly leaves the house, realizing Jesse is planning something. Jesse draws his gun and confronts the dealers, and as the dealers draw their own guns, Walt arrives and plows into both dealers with his car, killing one and badly injuring the other; Walt then picks up a gun and shoots the other dealer in the head. Walt instructs a shocked Jesse to "run".
33	13	"Full Measure"	Vince Gilligan	Vince Gilligan	June 13, 2010	1.56
After killing the drug dealers, Walt has a tense meeting with Gus, who makes it clear that his patience has reached its limit. Walt professes not to know the whereabouts of Jesse, who he falsely claims has fled the state. Gus chooses Walt's new assistant, who turns out to be Gale. In a meeting with Gale, Gus says that with his overhead he cannot afford to lose even a week's production. Walt realizes Gus intends to replace him with Gale, the only other trained chemist, and that he will be killed once Gale masters Walt's procedure. Walt deduces that they will have to kill Gale, knowing that Gus will have to keep him, and by extension Jesse, alive once he is the only trained chemist left. As Walt prepares to leave his house to kill Gale, Victor arrives and forces Walt to meet with Mike at the lab. Realizing he is about to be executed, Walt calls Jesse and orders him to murder Gale. Victor races to Gale's apartment to stop this, but Jesse arrives first. After some hesitation, Jesse tearfully pulls his gun on Gale and fires.

== Production ==
Unlike the second season, when the Breaking Bad writers planned the storyline for the entire season in advance of filming, the writing staff did not fully plan out the third season before production and instead developed the storyline as the episodes progressed. The third episode is dedicated to Shari Rhodes (the location casting director for Breaking Bad) who died due to breast cancer during the filming.

Gennifer Hutchison and Thomas Schnauz were added to the writing staff this season, both of whom had worked previously with Vince Gilligan on The X-Files. With the exception of John Shiban, who would leave at the end of the season to executive produce Hell on Wheels, the writing staff for season three would remain on the show until its conclusion in 2013.

== Reception ==
=== Reviews ===
The third season of Breaking Bad scored 89 out of 100 on review aggregator site Metacritic indicating "universal acclaim". On review aggregator Rotten Tomatoes, the third season has an approval rating of 100% based on 36 reviews, with an average rating of 9.2/10. The site's critics consensus reads: "Breaking Bad's well-toned storytelling flares up this season with dramatic story changes and calculated direction." Time proclaimed "It's a drama that has chosen the slow burn over the flashy explosion, and it's all the hotter for that choice." Newsday stated Breaking Bad was still TV's best series and it stayed true to itself. Tim Goodman praised the writing, acting, and cinematography, pointing out the "visual adventurousness" of the series. Goodman went on to call the show's visuals as "a combination of staggering beauty – the directors make use of numerous wide-angle landscape portraits — and transfixing weirdness." After the finale aired, The A.V. Club said that season three was "one of television's finest dramatic accomplishments. And what makes it so exciting — what makes the recognition of the current golden age so pressing — is that the season has not been, as [another reviewer] put it in another context, 'television good.' The heart-in-the-throat quality of this season comes as much from the writers' exhilarating disregard for television conventions as from the events portrayed."

=== Awards and nominations ===
The third season received numerous awards and nominations, including seven Primetime Emmy Award nominations with two wins. Bryan Cranston won his third consecutive award for Outstanding Lead Actor in a Drama Series and Aaron Paul won for Outstanding Supporting Actor in a Drama Series after being nominated the previous year. The series received its second consecutive nomination for Outstanding Drama Series; Michelle MacLaren was nominated for Outstanding Directing for a Drama Series for "One Minute". Michael Slovis was nominated for Outstanding Cinematography for a One Hour Series for "No Más"; Skip Macdonald received his second nomination for Outstanding Single Camera Picture-Editing for a Drama Series for "No Más", and it was also nominated for Outstanding Sound Editing for "One Minute".

The series received four nominations for the Television Critics Association Awards, winning for Outstanding Achievement in Drama. Bryan Cranston and Aaron Paul were each nominated for Individual Achievement in Drama, with the series being nominated for Program of the Year. Cranston received his second Golden Globe nomination for Best Actor in a Drama Series. Cranston also received a Screen Actors Guild Award nomination for Outstanding Performance by a Male Actor in a Drama Series. Cranston won his third consecutive Satellite Award for Best Actor in a Drama Series, with the series winning the award for Best Drama Series for the second year in a row. Paul was nominated for Best Actor in a Supporting Role in a Series, Mini-Series or Motion Picture Made for Television. The series received four nominations for the Saturn Awards, winning the award for Best Syndicated/Cable Television Series for the second year in a row. Cranston was nominated for Best Actor on Television, Paul and Dean Norris were nominated for Best Supporting Actor on Television, and Giancarlo Esposito was nominated for Best Guest Starring Role on Television. The series received three Writers Guild of America Award nominations, for Best Drama Series, George Mastras for Best Episodic Drama for "I.F.T.", and Gennifer Hutchison for Best Episodic Drama for "I See You".

Year	Award	Category	Recipient	Result	Ref.
2010	Primetime Emmy Awards	Outstanding Drama Series	Breaking Bad	Nominated	
2010	Primetime Emmy Awards	Outstanding Actor in a Drama Series	Bryan Cranston; Episode: "Full Measure"	Won	
2010	Primetime Emmy Awards	Outstanding Supporting Actor in a Drama Series	Aaron Paul; Episode: "Half Measures"	Won	
2010	Primetime Emmy Awards	Outstanding Director for a Drama Series	Michelle MacLaren; Episode: "One Minute"	Nominated	
2010	Primetime Emmy Awards	Outstanding Cinematography for a Single-Camera Series (One Hour)	Michael Slovis; Episode: "No Mas"	Nominated	
2010	Primetime Emmy Awards	Outstanding Single-Camera Picture Editing - Drama Series	Skip Macdonald; Episode: "No Mas"	Nominated	
2010	Primetime Emmy Awards	Outstanding Sound Editing for a Series	Breaking Bad; Episode: "One Minute"	Nominated	

James Poniewozik of TIME named "One Minute" as the fourth-best television episode of 2010. He also included "Fly", "Half Measures" and "Full Measure" on his list of honorable mentions. The Futon Critic listed "Full Measure" as the sixth-best episode of 2010, saying that "No show has played with the expectations of we've come to expect from television more than Breaking Bad. IGN named Breaking Bad the best television series of 2010.

== Home media ==
The third season was released on DVD in Region 1 and on Blu-ray in Region A on June 7, 2011, in Region 4 on November 24, 2010 and in Region 2 in Germany on May 19, 2011.

Special features on the DVD and Blu-ray include nine audio commentaries:

- "No Más" by Bryan Cranston, Aaron Paul, Anna Gunn, Skip Macdonald, Dave Porter, and Michael Slovis
- "Más" by Vince Gilligan, Bryan Cranston, Aaron Paul, Anna Gunn, Bob Odenkirk, and Moira Walley-Beckett
- "Sunset" by Vince Gilligan, Dean Norris, John Shiban, Kelley Dixon, and Thomas Golubic
- "One Minute" by Dean Norris, Luis Moncada, Daniel Moncada, Michelle MacLaren, Thomas Schnauz, and Dave Porter
- "I See You" by Vince Gilligan, Bryan Cranston, Betsy Brandt, RJ Mitte, and Gennifer Hutchison
- "Kafkaesque" by Vince Gilligan, Betsy Brandt, George Mastras, and Michael Slovis
- "Fly" by Vince Gilligan, Bryan Cranston, Aaron Paul, and Moira Walley-Beckett
- "Half Measures" by Bryan Cranston, Adam Bernstein, Bill Powloski, Peter Gould, Jonathan Banks, and Michael Slovis
- "Full Measure" by Vince Gilligan, Aaron Paul, Anna Gunn, Bob Odenkirk, and Jonathan Banks

Behind-the-scene featurettes include:

- 20 episodes of "Inside Breaking Bad"
- "Hit and Run"
- "The Music of Breaking Bad"
- "White Heat: Cranston on Fire"
- "Pizza of Destiny: Cranston's Greatest Shot"
- "Silent But Deadly: The Brothers Moncada"
- "Team S.C.I.E.N.C.E."
- "AMC News Visits the Breaking Bad Writer's Room"
- Mini video podcasts for every episode

Also included are a gag reel, deleted scenes, and "Better Call Saul" commercials and testimonials. Exclusive to the Blu-ray release is the Breaking Bad cast and crew photo collection.
