= Fly (Breaking Bad) =

- Breaking Bad episode
- Episode no.: Season 3 Episode 10
- Directed by: Rian Johnson
- Written by: Sam Catlin; Moira Walley-Beckett
- Cinematography by: Michael Slovis
- Editing by: Kelley Dixon
- Original air date: May 23, 2010
- Running time: 47 minutes

Episode chronology
← Previous "Kafkaesque"	Next → "Abiquiu"
- Breaking Bad season 3

"Fly" is the tenth episode of the third season of the American television crime drama series Breaking Bad, and the 30th overall episode of the series. Written by Sam Catlin and Moira Walley-Beckett and directed by Rian Johnson, it aired on AMC in the United States and Canada on May 23, 2010.

== Plot ==
Walter White, suffering from insomnia, stares up at his smoke detector's red flashing status light while trying to get back to sleep. Later, he arrives with Jesse Pinkman at the meth lab, where they begin making another batch of meth. At the end of the day, Walt calculates that their yield, while above what they are required to produce, falls short of what he expects. Jesse, who has been secretly taking small amounts for personal distribution, suggests it may be from spillage or other losses, but Walt insists there is another reason.

After Jesse leaves for the day, Walt sees a housefly in the lab, which he fears could contaminate the meth-making process. He tries numerous means to swat it, even dangling precariously from the lab's catwalk, from which he slips and falls to the floor. When Jesse returns the next day, he finds Walt still in pain from the fall and insisting that they cannot start cooking until they get rid of the fly. Jesse worries about Walt's lack of sleep and suggests they go outside to figure it out. However, when Jesse leaves, Walt locks him out of the lab and goes back to find the fly. When Jesse disconnects the main power to the lab, Walt lets him back in so they can work together. Jesse gets some flypaper which they hang around the lab, as well as some sleeping pills that he secretly puts into Walt's coffee. He then recounts a story about his late aunt, who experienced auditory hallucinations as a result of her cancer spreading to her brain. Walt asserts that he is still in remission.

As they wait to catch the fly, the two talk about their families. Walt states that he should have died already and tries to think of the perfect moment to have done so: after he had enough money, after his daughter Holly was born, before his surgery and before Skyler knew what he had been doing. He finally decides the perfect moment to die would have been the night Jane Margolis died, telling Jesse of his conversation with her father Donald. (Note: As depicted in "Phoenix".) He tries to calculate the chances of meeting both father and daughter in different scenarios on the same night despite having never met either beforehand, but finds the odds too astronomical to calculate. Jesse is distracted when he sees the fly near the ceiling. As he tries to use a step-ladder to reach the fly, an increasingly-sleepy Walt seems poised to confess to Jesse about his role in Jane's death. Jesse tells him Jane's death was nobody's fault, but he still misses her. Walt tells him to give up on the fly and start working, decrying that "it's all contaminated." Jesse climbs back down and, seeing the fly land on the ladder, swats and kills it.

Jesse takes a sleeping Walt to a couch while he cleans up the lab and prepares for their next batch. They later leave together, but Walt warns Jesse that if he has been skimming from their product, he will not be able to protect him if Gus Fring finds out. Jesse denies taking anything and states that he is not asking anyone to protect him. That night, Walt is awakened by buzzing, and sees a fly landing on the smoke detector's flashing light.

== Production ==
"Fly" was produced as a result of the series' considerable budgetary restrictions and being unable to afford the $25,000–$35,000 needed to move the production trucks to a new location. Series creator Vince Gilligan remarked: "We were hopelessly over budget ... And we needed to come up with what is called a bottle episode, set in one location." The episode was written by Sam Catlin and Moira Walley-Beckett, and directed by Rian Johnson; it aired on AMC in the United States and Canada on May 23, 2010.

Apart from extras in the laundromat, Bryan Cranston and Aaron Paul are the only two actors who appear in the episode. Series regulars Dean Norris (Hank), Betsy Brandt (Marie), and RJ Mitte (Walt Jr.) are credited but do not appear. Anna Gunn (Skyler)'s voice is heard in the episode, but it is reused audio from the second-season episode "Phoenix".

Gilligan noted that the limited setting and cast allowed for a slower pace and deeper exploration of character traits and motives:

Even if financial realities didn't enter into it, I feel as a showrunner that there should be a certain shape and pace to each season, and the really high highs that you try to get to at the end of a season – the big dramatic moments of action and violence, the big operatic moments you're striving for – I don't think would land as hard if you didn't have the moments of quiet that came before them. The quiet episodes make the tenser, more dramatic episodes pop even more than they usually would just by their contrast.

— Vince Gilligan

== Reception ==
=== Viewership ===
The episode's original broadcast was viewed by 1.20 million people, which was a decrease from the 1.62 million of the previous episode, "Kafkaesque". It has the second-lowest number of viewers on its original broadcast of any season-three episode, just ahead of "Half Measures" (1.19 million).

=== Reviews ===
Donna Bowman of The A.V. Club gave "Fly" an A grade, praising Rian Johnson's direction and remarking that the episode "would have been stellar even with more conventional direction, but with the unhinged images and bold juxtapositions Johnson provides, it's one of the most distinctive hours of television we're likely to see this year." In Time, James Poniewozik called it "the most unusual and very possibly best episode of Breaking Bad so far", comparing it favorably to The Sopranos' "Pine Barrens". In Entertainment Weekly, Ken Tucker said he would be "shocked if both Bryan Cranston and Aaron Paul don't use the episode for Emmy consideration", and lauded it for "[opening] up to become an opportunity for Walt and Jesse to explain more fully the sadnesses and regrets they have over everything".

Alan Sepinwall, writing for HitFix, speculated that "Fly" may be "the best bottle show ever" and remarked in the subtitle of his review that the budget-saving approach ended up leading to "an instant classic". Emma Dibdin of Digital Spy, Kathryn Kernohan of Junkee, and Kaitlin Thomas of TV.com have all ranked it among the show's best episodes. In 2013, Matt Zoller Seitz, writing for Vulture, named "Fly" the greatest episode of the entire series, calling it a "perfect Breaking Bad episode and a perfect hour of television". The same year, it was ranked fifth in Entertainment Weekly's ranking of all 62 episodes from best-to-worst, with Darren Franich writing, "Some people despise 'Fly' for its artsy pretensions and its go-nowhere plot arc. Others frankly think it belongs much higher on this list. But we can all agree that 'Fly' is one of the great bottle episodes of the new golden age of TV." Ian Sandwell named this episode as number one best bottle episode.

However, Tasha Robinson of The A.V. Club argued that the episode presents "a vision of Walt that did not in any way coincide with the mental image I'd built of him over the course of the series, as a self-justifying, angry man who could be a real badass when required: Instead, we have to see him as irrational and petty to the point of rank stupidity, taking moronic action after action that clearly risks his safety and well-being ... all to catch a fly." Robinson "hated it", writing about the episode for an article in which numerous writers for the site discussed what they thought were the weakest episodes of great shows.

In 2016, The Guardian named the episode on its list of the best hour of television ever. In 2019, The Ringer ranked "Fly" as the 14th best out of the 62 total Breaking Bad episodes, and Vulture ranked it 15th overall. That same year, MovieWeb stated that some consider it to be the worst episode of the series simply because it is a bottle episode. Again in 2019, Business Insider stated that it was the "most-hated" episode of the series.

In 2025, Collider said it was "the most polarizing episode" of the series, and opined that it was not essential to the overall plot, comparing it to an episode of a sitcom: "On paper, the episode is supposed to be a clever metaphor about control, guilt, and a man on the verge of breaking down. But in reality, it's 47 minutes of two grown men trying to swat a fly. You could skip the episode entirely and not miss a beat in the story or character arcs." That same year, Screen Rant stated the opinion that the episode was controversial among fans of the series due to heightened expectations regarding plot points due to the raising of stakes in the preceding episodes.
