= Abiquiu (Breaking Bad) =

- Breaking Bad episode
- Episode no.: Season 3 Episode 11
- Directed by: Michelle MacLaren
- Written by: John Shiban; Thomas Schnauz
- Cinematography by: Michael Slovis
- Editing by: Skip Macdonald
- Original air date: May 30, 2010
- Running time: 47 minutes

Guest appearances
- Krysten Ritter as Jane Margolis; Matt Jones as Badger Mayhew; Jere Burns as Jesse's group leader; Emily Rios as Andrea Cantillo; Charles Baker as Skinny Pete; Ian Posada as Brock Cantillo; Angelo Martinez as Tomás Cantillo; Marius Stan as Bogdan Wolynetz

Episode chronology
← Previous "Fly"	Next → "Half Measures"
- Breaking Bad season 3

"Abiquiu" is the eleventh episode of the third season of the American television drama series Breaking Bad, and the 31st overall episode of the series. It was written by John Shiban and Thomas Schnauz and directed by Michelle MacLaren. The title refers to Abiquiú, New Mexico, where Georgia O'Keeffe had a home and studio.

== Plot ==
In a flashback, Jesse Pinkman and Jane Margolis visit the Georgia O'Keeffe Museum and view O'Keeffe's painting My Last Door. They debate its meaning before Jane concludes that O'Keeffe was simply trying to make a good feeling last.

In the present, Hank Schrader is frustrated with his physical therapy. Marie gives Skyler White the therapy bill to pay as they previously discussed. Walter White attempts to pay with drug money, but Skyler insists the source must be "unimpeachable." Walt takes her to meet Saul Goodman, who is handling Walt's money laundering. Skyler is put off by his flippant personality and his scheme to buy a laser tag facility. Instead, she suggests a more believable business investment: the car wash where Walt previously worked. Saul objects, but Skyler offers to help by managing the car wash. Walt worries that this would make her liable for his actions, but she reveals she never filed for divorce, so spousal privilege will apply.

Walt warns Jesse to stop skimming from the meth they produce. Jesse takes what he has stolen to Badger Mayhew and Skinny Pete so they can sell it at a Narcotics Anonymous (NA) meeting. They are hesitant to sell to recovering addicts, so Jesse shows how easy it is by striking up a conversation with newcomer Andrea Cantillo. He soon becomes attracted to Andrea, and she invites him to her home, where Jesse discovers she has a son, Brock. From Brock, Jesse learns that Andrea has a pre-teen brother, Tomás, although she initially refuses to talk about him. Andrea later suggests they use meth, but Jesse declines now that he knows she has a child. Andrea insists she wants to avoid having Brock go down the same path as Tomás, who shot a rival dealer as part of a drug gang initiation. Jesse recognizes that the story matches details of Combo's murder a few months prior. (Note: As depicted in "Mandala".)

Gus invites Walt to his home for a private dinner. He tells Walt he regrets not having a mentor and warns him to never make the same mistake twice. The next day, Jesse travels to the corner where Combo was killed. He finds Tomás there, and while buying meth from him, sees the faces of the drug dealers who rule the territory. Jesse quietly walks away, enraged.

== Production ==
The episode was written by John Shiban and Thomas Schnauz, and directed by Michelle MacLaren; it aired on AMC in the United States and Canada on May 30, 2010.

== Reception ==
=== Viewership ===
The episode's original broadcast was viewed by 1.32 million people, an increase from the 1.20 million from the previous episode, "Fly".

=== Reviews ===
Seth Amitin of IGN gave the episode a rating of 8.9 out of 10 commenting: "Breaking Bad has been one of the few shows on television to have amazing story arcs and characters, not just in each episode, but in the series as a whole. "Abiquiú" was a great example of this."

Donna Bowman of The A.V. Club gave the episode an A− rating, noting "it's become increasingly obvious this season how quickly Breaking Bad has decided to move through its starting premises."

In 2019, The Ringer ranked "Abiquiú" 49th of the 62 Breaking Bad episodes. Vulture ranked it 42nd overall.
