= Full Measure (Breaking Bad) =

- Breaking Bad episode
- Jesse is in tears as he is about to shoot Gale.
- Episode no.: Season 3 Episode 13
- Directed by: Vince Gilligan
- Written by: Vince Gilligan
- Cinematography by: Michael Slovis
- Editing by: Kelley Dixon; Skip Macdonald
- Original air date: June 13, 2010
- Running time: 47 minutes

Guest appearances
- David Costabile as Gale Boetticher; Jeremiah Bitsui as Victor; Kaija Roze Bales as Kaylee Ehrmantraut; James Ning as Duane Chow

Episode chronology
← Previous "Half Measures"	Next → "Box Cutter"
- Breaking Bad season 3

"Full Measure" is the thirteenth episode and season finale of the third season of the American television crime drama series Breaking Bad, and the 33rd overall episode of the series. It was written and directed by the show's creator and executive producer Vince Gilligan.

It originally aired on AMC in the United States on June 13, 2010.

== Plot ==
In a flashback to 1993, Walter and Skyler White, who's pregnant with Walter Jr., are shown by a realtor the house where they will eventually live. Walt, then working at the prestigious Sandia Laboratory, envisions a bright future with three children and worries that they are not setting their sights high enough with the "starter house".

In the present, after Jesse Pinkman goes on the run, Walt meets with Gus Fring and Mike Ehrmantraut to negotiate for his and Jesse's safety. Walt pleads with Gus to tolerate the incident, let him return to cooking and agree to forget about Jesse. Gus accedes but informs Walt that he will be choosing Jesse's replacement.

The next day, Walt arrives at the lab and discovers that Gale Boetticher has been reinstated as his partner, and Victor now supervises them constantly. That evening, Gus visits Gale at his apartment and informs him of Walt's cancer. Gus tells Gale he must learn Walt's method to prepare for the "worst-case scenario."

Mike demands Jesse's location from Saul Goodman, who refuses to cooperate. When Mike physically threatens him, Saul allows Mike to look at a notebook containing a fake address for a trailer park in Virginia. Later, Walt and Saul meet with Jesse, who is hiding in a local laser tag arcade. Walt informs Jesse of his situation and explains that when Gale is confident enough to take over, they will be disposed of. Jesse argues that Walt should turn himself into the police, but Walt refuses to cooperate with the DEA. They decide they must kill Gale and debate over who should do it. After Jesse says that he is not a murderer, Walt says he will do the job, and Jesse only needs to find Gale's address. Later that evening, Jesse calls Walt and tells him the address.

As Walt is leaving his home to kill Gale, Victor arrives and claims there is a chemical leak at the lab. Walt suspects a setup but is forced to go with Victor. Upon arriving at the laundromat, Walt sees Mike, confirming his suspicions. Pleading for his life, Walt offers to give them Jesse. Mike demands Jesse's location, but Walt says he needs to call him and set up a meeting. When Jesse answers the call, Walt tells Jesse to kill Gale before Victor and Mike can wrestle the phone away from him. When Walt quotes Gale's address to them, they realize what he has told Jesse to do. Victor hurriedly leaves; Mike stays with Walt and attempts to warn Gale, but Gale does not notice his phone ringing. Jesse arrives at Gale's apartment and pulls a gun on him. Gale begs for his life, but a tearful and shaking Jesse reluctantly pulls the trigger.

== Production ==
The episode ends with Jesse's pulling a gun on Gale and firing directly into the screen, with Gale's death not visibly revealed on-screen. This led to wide speculation among fans and reviewers that Jesse did not actually kill Gale, but rather aimed away from him and fired the gun. However, Gilligan said he never intended for that scene to be a cliffhanger and he believed it clearly conveyed that Gale had died.

David Costabile, who portrayed Gale, has stated that he did not initially know his character was to be killed off: "It was quite a sadness when I was informed that my doom was imminent. [...] I probably knew about halfway through. I think sometimes one has to be sacrificed."

== Reception ==
Upon first initial airing, the episode was watched by 1.56 million American viewers, and attained an 18–49 rating/share of 0.7/2.

Bryan Cranston won his third consecutive Primetime Emmy Award for Outstanding Lead Actor in a Drama Series for his performance in this episode.

Tim Goodman of the San Francisco Chronicle praised the season's character development, describing the finale as "an exclamation mark on the tortured journey of Jesse". Maureen Ryan of the Chicago Tribune believed the episode "mixed action with character beats well." Donna Bowman of The A.V. Club stated the episode "should cement this season of Breaking Bad as one of television's finest dramatic accomplishments". Seth Amitin of IGN gave the episode a 9, saying that "[it] wasn't the best episode this season, but it was still a good one and we got to know more about the rest of the players."

The finale of the episode (and season), where Jesse Pinkman hesitantly shoots Gale point-blank, was critically acclaimed. Stephen Lagioia, writing for Screen Rant, said the moment was a pivotal one for Jesse's character development, calling the scene "a pretty somber and disturbing moment." Being called one of the saddest, and most shocking deaths in the series by various critics, Amanda Harding said Gale's death was a turning point in Jesse's and Walter's relationship, and also said the ending further moved Walter into becoming his darker persona, Heisenberg.

In 2019, The Ringer ranked "Full Measure" as the second best out of the 62 total Breaking Bad episodes. Vulture ranked it 17th overall.

In 2025, Milo Pope of Metro called the episode's ending "The greatest cliffhanger in TV history," saying it "can rip out your heart and dump it right in front of you, whether you’re on a train watching through your iPhone or sitting at home on the sofa."
