= No Half Measures =

No half measures may refer to:

- No Half Measures, an award category in Kerrang! Awards 2010
- No Half Measures, the 1985 autobiography of Graeme Souness

== See also ==
- "Half Measures", a Breaking Bad episode
- Half measure (disambiguation)
