= Half measure =

Half measure or half measures may refer to:

- Half measure, a half bar in music
- Half, one of several alcohol measurements
- "Half Measures", an episode of TV series Breaking Bad
- Half Measures, a mixtape by Armand Hammer
- "Half Measures", a song by Good Riddance from the album Peace in Our Time

== See also ==
- No Half Measures (disambiguation)
