= Marius Stan =

Marius Stan may refer to:

- Marius Stan (scientist) (born 1961), Romanian scientist and actor
- Marius Stan (politician) (born 1957), a Romanian former footballer turned politician
