= Half Measures =

- Breaking Bad episode
- Walt runs over the rival dealers with his car.
- Episode no.: Season 3 Episode 12
- Directed by: Adam Bernstein
- Written by: Sam Catlin; Peter Gould
- Cinematography by: Michael Slovis
- Editing by: Kelley Dixon
- Original air date: June 6, 2010
- Running time: 47 minutes

Guest appearances
- Emily Rios as Andrea Cantillo; Jeremiah Bitsui as Victor; Julia Minesci as Wendy; Ian Posada as Brock Cantillo; Angelo Martinez as Tomás Cantillo

Episode chronology
← Previous "Abiquiu"	Next → "Full Measure"
- Breaking Bad season 3

"Half Measures" is the twelfth and penultimate episode of the third season of the American television drama series Breaking Bad, and the 32nd overall episode of the series. It originally aired on AMC in the United States on June 6, 2010.

== Plot ==
Skyler White pushes Walt to accept her plan of laundering his drug money through the car wash. Meanwhile, Jesse Pinkman begins to plot against the drug dealers who killed Combo Ortega. Having bought the blue meth from the gang responsible, confirming that Combo's killers work for Gus Fring, Jesse tells Walt and asks him to make ricin to exact revenge. Although Walt appears troubled by the gang's use of children, he dismisses the plan. Jesse replies he will kill them with or without help.

Convinced Jesse is likely to do something rash, Walt visits Saul Goodman and they plan to have Jesse jailed, albeit briefly, to cool down. Meanwhile, Marie Schrader wheels Hank out of the hospital, after betting she can arouse him during a sponge bath.

Mike Ehrmantraut makes an unannounced visit to Walt at home and reveals he also works for Gus, who would "take it as a problem" if Jesse would be jailed. Mike then tells Walt a story from his years as a cop, in which he laments showing mercy to an alcoholic, continually-abusive husband who subsequently killed his wife. Mike tells Walt he chose a "half measure" by giving the husband a warning instead of killing him on the spot, and warns: "No more half measures, Walter."

Jesse plants ricin in hamburgers intended for Gus' dealers but is unable to find them at their usual location. He is stopped by Mike and Victor who bring him to a meeting with Gus, Walt, and the two targeted dealers. After tense negotiations, Gus promises his dealers will stop using children as pawns, and Jesse reluctantly promises to "keep the peace." On their way back, Walt tries to calm down the furious Jesse, who refuses to respond.

That night, Tomás, the eleven year old boy who was dealing drugs, is killed. Tomás' sister Andrea rushes to the scene along with Jesse, who realizes the two street dealers have executed Tomás, as he is no longer of value to them. The next day, Jesse fails to show up for a cooking session with Walt, who decides to start without him. During dinner with his family, Walt learns about Tomás' murder on TV and abruptly leaves his house.

Jesse watches the dealers from afar and snorts meth for the first time since rehab, breaking his sobriety. He draws his gun and slowly approaches the two dealers, who draw their own guns and prepare for a confrontation. Suddenly, Walt plows into both dealers with his car, killing one and badly injuring the other. Walt gets out of his car, picks up the injured dealer's gun, and shoots him in the head, killing him. Walt then tells an utterly shocked Jesse one word: "Run."

== Reception ==
Aaron Paul won the Primetime Emmy Award for Outstanding Supporting Actor in a Drama Series for his performance in this episode.

In IGN's review, the episode is described as "fun, creative, well-directed, well-acted and set us up for what's going to be an awesome finale", and was given a 9.7 rating.

In 2019, The Ringer ranked "Half Measures" as the 15th best out of the 62 total Breaking Bad episodes. Vulture ranked it 18th overall.
