= Phoenix (Breaking Bad) =

- Breaking Bad episode
- Walter White unknowingly meets Donald Margolis in a bar, prior to his daughter, Jane Margolis's death later in the episode
- Episode no.: Season 2 Episode 12
- Directed by: Colin Bucksey
- Written by: John Shiban
- Cinematography by: Michael Slovis
- Editing by: Kelley Dixon
- Original air date: May 24, 2009
- Running time: 47 minutes

Guest appearances
- Bob Odenkirk as Saul Goodman; Krysten Ritter as Jane Margolis; Christopher Cousins as Ted Beneke; John de Lancie as Donald Margolis

Episode chronology
| ← Previous "Mandala" | Next → "ABQ" |
- Breaking Bad season 2

"Phoenix" is the twelfth episode of the second season of the American television crime drama series Breaking Bad. The episode aired on AMC on May 24, 2009.

== Plot ==
Walter White barely delivers the inventory of drugs to Gus Fring in time, but misses his daughter Holly's birth. He arrives at the hospital, where he finds that Ted Beneke drove Skyler White there. At Jesse Pinkman's apartment, Jane Margolis wakes up when she is phoned by her father, Donald, because she is late for a Narcotics Anonymous meeting. At lunch afterward, she does not mention that she has started using heroin again, and acts as though she does not know Jesse when her father asks about him. Jesse, seeing the aftermath of Walt's search, initially believes he was robbed, but then listens to the phone messages Walt left. Walt, unable to tell anyone else in his family about the money, privately shows Holly the stacks of cash hidden in the garage walls. Later, Jesse shows up at Walt's classroom to ask for his share of the money, which Walt refuses because he believes it will further Jesse's addiction. Jesse claims he has not used any drugs recently, but refuses and leaves when Walt prompts him to take a urine test.

Later, Jesse and Jane inject heroin in his apartment. As he passes out, Jesse complains about Walt holding out on him, telling Jane that he is owed $480,000. Donald calls Jane again when she is late for another rehab meeting; unbeknownst to Jane, he is waiting directly outside. Seeing her emerging from Jesse's door, he barges in and finds evidence of them both using heroin. He is furious that she has relapsed and calls the police, but doesn't finish it to make an official report when Jane promises she will enter rehab the next day. He relents and gives her another chance. Meanwhile, Walter Jr. has put up a website so that people can donate to Walt's cancer surgery utilizing PayPal. Walt does not want to accept charity, especially because he earned the money to pay for his treatment, but cannot reveal its source to his family. Saul Goodman tells him that he will contact a hacker to launder the money, making it look like it is coming from computers all over the world and averting suspicions by putting in small amounts.

Jane calls Walt to blackmail him into giving Jesse his share. Walt delivers the money to Jesse and Jane, who are ecstatic and talk of getting clean, but still feel a strong pull to use their remaining heroin. Walt goes to a bar to unwind, where he unknowingly sits next to Donald. The two start talking about the Phoenix probe's discovery of water on Mars and about Donald's daughter and Walt's "nephew" (Jesse), voicing their frustrations over trying to help people who will not do what is good for them. Donald opines that one can never give up on one's family. Motivated by Donald's words, Walt goes back to Jesse's house to talk to him but finds Jesse and Jane passed out from heroin use. While Walt is trying to wake Jesse, he inadvertently knocks Jane onto her back; she starts to choke on her own vomit. Walt rushes to help, but after hesitating for a moment he changes his mind and lets her die to ensure Jesse’s loyalty. Afterwards, he briefly cries before looking on resolutely.

== Production ==
The episode was written by John Shiban, and directed by Colin Bucksey. It aired on AMC in the United States and Canada on May 24, 2009.

Actress Krysten Ritter recounted filming her character's death scene and its effect on her: "It wasn't really until we were shooting it that the whole death around the character hit me. So, I knew I was gonna die. I'm reading the script, I'm like, 'Cool, rock and roll, she dies. So fun!' But then you're doing it, you're in this death makeup; they built a cast for my chest so that Aaron Paul can really be pounding on my chest. And then Bryan, after the take, you just see him sitting quietly in the corner. It was intense, and I will never forget it." Cranston’s crying during the scene was not scripted, having become emotional after imagining his daughter, Taylor Dearden, in Ritter’s place as the scene was being filmed.

== Critical reception ==
Emily St. James, recapping the episode for Slant, noted that it was "a beautifully rich and layered work about the various ways parents and children disappoint each other." Donna Bowman, writing for The A.V. Club, gave the episode an A rating, commenting: "it is perhaps the single best episode to date in one of the best shows television has ever produced." Alan Sepinwall praised Bryan Cranston's performance in the episode's climactic scene and drew comparisons to "Kennedy and Heidi," an episode of The Sopranos. Seth Amitin at IGN gave the episode an 8.9/10 and opined that the episode was effective at increasing the dramatic stakes leading into the season's finale, stating that "everything about this episode was used to push tension one step further for the finale."

For his performance, Cranston won his second of three consecutive Outstanding Lead Actor in a Drama Series at the 61st Primetime Emmy Awards. Shiban was nominated for a Writers Guild of America Award for episodic drama for the episode "Phoenix" in 2010.

In Cranston's own 2016 memoir A Life in Parts, he begins the book by recounting the process of filming the final scene in the episode. He recalls how he imagined his own daughter Taylor Dearden as Jane, and describes the scene as "the most harrowing I did on Breaking Bad".

In 2019, The Ringer ranked "Phoenix" as the 17th best out of the 62 total Breaking Bad episodes. Vulture ranked it 23rd overall.
