= Scott Wampler =

American podcaster and journalist (died 2024)

Scott Wampler (1980/81 – May 31, 2024) was an American podcaster and film journalist. He was the co-host of the Stephen King fan podcast The Kingcast. He was a writer for Fangoria.

He was found dead at his home in Austin, Texas on May 31, 2024. The 2024 film The Life of Chuck is dedicated to his memory.
