= Pilot (Breaking Bad) =

- Breaking Bad episode
- Walter White anticipates the supposed police.
- Episode no.: Season 1 Episode 1
- Directed by: Vince Gilligan
- Written by: Vince Gilligan
- Cinematography by: John Toll
- Editing by: Lynne Willingham
- Original air date: January 20, 2008
- Running time: 58 minutes

Guest appearances
- Max Arciniega as Krazy-8; John Koyama as Emilio Koyama; Steven Michael Quezada as Steven Gomez; Marius Stan as Bogdan Wolynetz; Carmen Serano as Carmen Molina

Episode chronology
← Previous —	Next → "Cat's in the Bag..."
- Breaking Bad season 1

"Pilot" (titled "Breaking Bad" on DVD and Blu-ray releases) is the series premiere of the American television crime drama series Breaking Bad. The episode was directed and written by series creator and showrunner Vince Gilligan. It first aired on AMC on January 20, 2008.

In the episode, chemistry teacher Walter White (Bryan Cranston) is diagnosed with terminal lung cancer. Keeping it an initial secret from his pregnant wife Skyler (Anna Gunn) and their teenage son Walter Jr. (RJ Mitte), he decides that he wants to spend his last years saving money for his family. After going on a drug bust with his brother-in-law and DEA agent Hank Schrader (Dean Norris), Walt spots his former student Jesse Pinkman (Aaron Paul) and later blackmails him into helping him cook methamphetamine in an RV.

The pilot received various nominations at the 60th Primetime Emmy Awards, with Cranston winning the Primetime Emmy Award for Outstanding Lead Actor in a Drama Series and Gilligan earning a nomination for Outstanding Directing.

== Plot ==
Walter "Walt" White is a high school chemistry teacher living in Albuquerque, New Mexico, with his pregnant wife, Skyler, and their teenage son Walter Jr., who has cerebral palsy. Walt is very dissatisfied with his life, needing to work a second job at a car wash in order to support himself and his family as well as lacking physical intimacy in his marriage.

During Walt's 50th birthday party, his brother-in-law Hank Schrader, a DEA agent, proudly shows the guests a news report detailing his latest drug bust, in which $700,000 of illegal drug money was confiscated. Walt appears curious and Hank offers to take him on a ride-along to a bust. Meanwhile, Skyler talks to her sister Marie Schrader, Hank's wife, about her pregnancy.

The next day, Walt collapses at the car wash and is taken to the hospital, where he is told that he has developed inoperable lung cancer and has, at best, two years to live. He decides to keep the news from his family. Returning to work, Walt lashes out at his boss Bogdan Wolynetz and storms out. He sits alone at home and ponders the news of his impending death.

Walt takes the offer to go on the ride-along with Hank and his partner Steven Gomez as they raid a meth lab. As DEA agents clear out the house, Walt observes Jesse Pinkman, a former student of his, fleeing the scene from a neighboring house. Later that night, Walt tracks down and blackmails Jesse into helping him produce crystal meth. After Walt steals chemistry supplies from the high school, he asks Jesse to purchase an RV to use as their meth lab.

The pair drive the RV into the desert and begin to cook. Due to Walt's expertise in chemistry, the batch of crystal meth they produce is unusually pure. Jesse, impressed, returns to the city and advertises the product to his distributor, Domingo "Krazy-8" Molina, but encounters Krazy-8's cousin, Emilio Koyama, who believes Jesse set him up during the drug bust. To prove his loyalty, Jesse rides with them to the RV, where they meet Walt. Emilio recognizes Walt from Hank's earlier bust which leads to the two being held at gunpoint. To save his life, Walt offers to show them how he makes meth. During the cook, Emilio tosses a lit cigarette out the window of the RV, causing a brush fire. Walt synthesizes phosphine gas with red phosphorus, causing an explosion, and flees the RV, trapping Emilio and Krazy-8 inside, where they are asphyxiated by the toxic gas.

Hearing sirens, Walt attempts to flee but drives the RV into a ditch. He stumbles out and records a video message to his family (Note: This is shown in medias res at the beginning of the episode.) before unsuccessfully trying to shoot himself. He then realizes that the sirens are not the police but are from fire trucks responding to the fire. Walt returns home, meeting his wife's troubled queries with new sexual vigor, causing her to ask "Walt, is that you?".

== Production ==
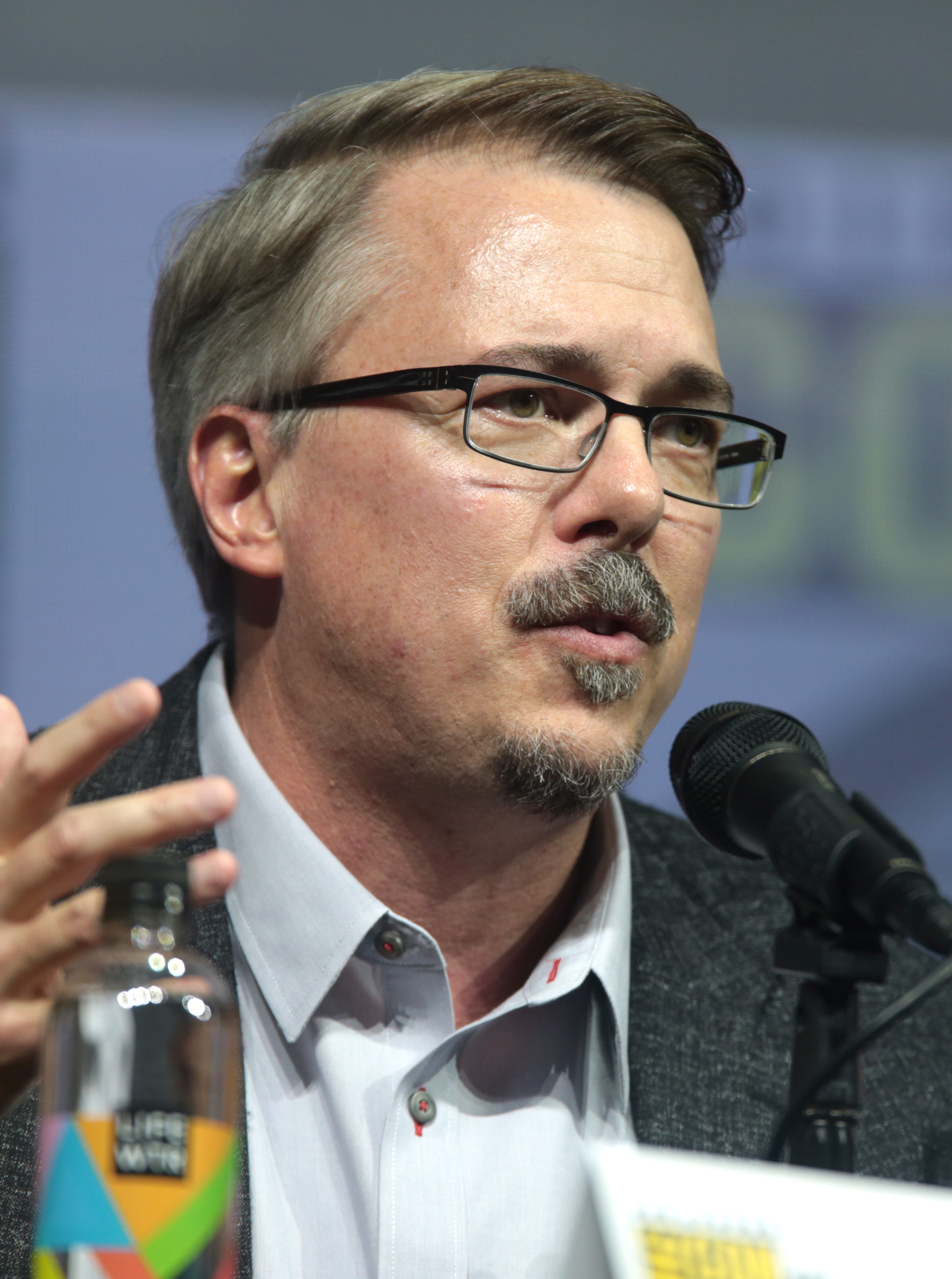
Series creator Vince Gilligan wrote and directed the pilot of Breaking Bad

Breaking Bad was created by television writer Vince Gilligan, with the crux of the series being the protagonist's journey into an antagonist. Noting how television shows usually kept their main character in the same state to prolong the series, Gilligan said he wanted to make a show serving as a "fundamental drive" towards change. He added that his goal with Walter White was to turn him "from Mr. Chips into Scarface." The concept of Walt as a meth dealer came to fruition when Gilligan was talking with fellow writer Thomas Schnauz, and they joked regarding their unemployment that the solution was to drive around cooking meth in an RV.

Gilligan cast Bryan Cranston for the role of Walter White based on having worked with him in "Drive", an episode of the sixth season of the science fiction television series The X-Files, where Gilligan worked as a writer. Cranston played an antisemite with a terminal illness who took Fox Mulder (David Duchovny) hostage. Gilligan said the character had to be simultaneously loathsome and sympathetic, and that only Cranston could play the part. AMC officials were wary of casting Cranston, due to him being mostly known for his comedic roles as Hal on the sitcom Malcolm in the Middle, and for appearances on Seinfeld so offered the role to John Cusack and Matthew Broderick, who both turned it down. After seeing Cranston in the X-Files episode, the executives were convinced to cast him. For his role, Cranston met frequently with a chemistry teacher to learn about the subject, gained fifteen pounds to reflect the character's personal decline, and had his hair dyed brown to mask his natural red highlights.

Various actors auditioned for the role of Jesse Pinkman, including Reid Scott, Colin Hanks, and Penn Badgley. However, the audition of Aaron Paul for the character, which he himself said was "awful", caught the attention of Gilligan and casting director Dawn Steinberg. When Sony Pictures Television refused to hire Paul on the basis that he did not look like a meth dealer, Gilligan told them that he would not make the show if Paul was not picked for the role. For the role of Hank Schrader, Gilligan spoke with an actual DEA agent to learn more information on the character. Dean Norris, who had a history of being typecast as law enforcement and military-type characters, stated that, "I guess you have a certain look, it's kind of an authoritative law enforcement-type look, and that look is certainly the first thing that people cast you with before you get a chance to do some acting."

The script was originally set in Riverside, California, but at the suggestion of Sony, which was producing the pilot, Albuquerque was chosen for production due to the favorable financial conditions offered by the state of New Mexico. Filming for the episode began on March 6, 2007, concluding after several weeks on March 21.

== Reception ==
=== Critical response ===
Barry Garron from The Hollywood Reporter praised the premiere for its suspense, and Jonathan Storm from The Philadelphia Inquirer found it unpredictable. Meanwhile, Robert Bianco of USA Today focused on Bryan Cranston's performance, which he said was "riveting and remarkable", and The A.V. Club journalist Donna Bowman wrote a positive review, giving the episode a grade rating of an "A−", and citing Cranston's "mesmerizing", "nihilistic", and "hulking yet impotent" performance along with lauding Vince Gilligan's screenplay. Furthermore, the Chicago Tribune television critic Maureen Ryan complimented Cranston's role, and noted the premiere as a "slam dunk" compared to the two following episodes. After the series concluded, The Ringer ranked "Pilot" 6th out of all 62 Breaking Bad episodes, where Alison Harman noted that "the addictive hook of the pilot helped power viewers through the couple of seasons it took for Breaking Bad to hit its stride".

=== Ratings and accolades ===
In 2013, Gilligan recalled the viewership for the episode being below a million viewers due to a football game that aired at the same time. However, The Hollywood Reporter revealed later in the same year that the pilot had been watched by 1.41 million people instead.

Vulture ranked the episode 10th-best overall in the series.

Awards and nominations received by "Pilot"
Award	Date of ceremony	Category	Nominee(s)	Result	Ref.
Primetime Emmy Awards	September 21, 2008	Outstanding Lead Actor in a Drama Series	Bryan Cranston	Nominated	
Primetime Emmy Awards	September 21, 2008	Outstanding Single-Camera Picture Editing for a Drama Series	Lynne Willingham	Won	
Primetime Emmy Awards	September 21, 2008	Outstanding Cinematography for a One Hour Series	John Toll	Nominated	
Primetime Emmy Awards	September 21, 2008	Outstanding Directing for a Drama Series	Vince Gilligan	Nominated	
Writers Guild of America Awards	February 7, 2009	Television: Episodic Drama	Vince Gilligan	Won	
