= Marius Stan (scientist) =

Romanian nuclear scientist and actor (born 1961)

- Born: Urziceni, Romania
- Citizenship: Romanian • American
- Education: University of Bucharest (BS); Romanian Academy (PhD)
- Occupations: Scientist, actor

Marius Stan (born c. 1961) is a Romanian–American scientist and actor from Urziceni, currently a senior scientist at the Applied Materials division at Argonne National Laboratory in Lemont, Illinois, where he uses artificial intelligence to design materials. Stan is best known for playing car wash owner Bogdan Wolynetz in the AMC television series Breaking Bad.

== Education ==
In 1986, Stan earned a Bachelor of Science degree in physics from the University of Bucharest. In 1997, he earned a PhD in chemistry from the Institute of Physical Chemistry of the Romanian Academy.

== Career ==
Stan was a scientist at the Los Alamos National Laboratory in Los Alamos, New Mexico before moving on to the Argonne National Laboratory, a national research laboratory jointly operated by the University of Chicago and Department of Energy, in 2010. From 2013 to 2015, Stan served in the Office of Nuclear Energy within the United States Department of Energy. Stan is also a writer of short fiction and poetry.

== Acting ==
While Stan was living in Los Alamos, the series Breaking Bad was casting extras in nearby Albuquerque. Stan's entire family was photographed for the casting directors, and, while his wife and children were selected as extras, Stan was cast in a speaking role in the pilot episode: Bogdan Wolynetz, the owner of the car wash where Walter White works. Stan would return to the role of Bogdan in the show's third and fourth seasons as part of an arc in which he begrudgingly sells the car wash to White.

== Filmography ==
=== Television ===
Year	Title	Role	Notes
2008; 2010–2011	Breaking Bad	Bogdan Wolynetz	5 episodes
2009	Crash	Imran	Episode: "You Set the Scene"
