= Betsy Brandt =

American actress (born 1973)

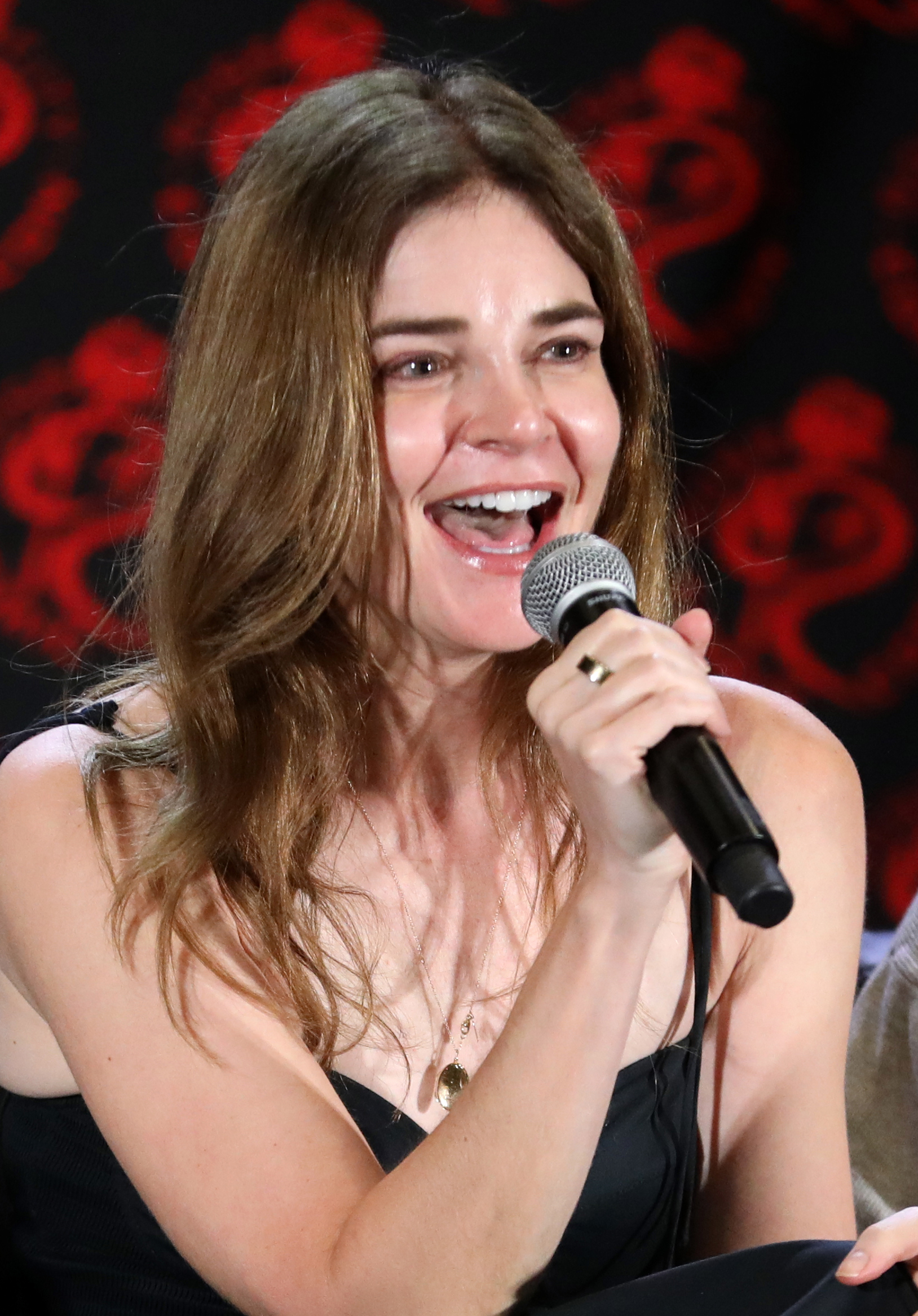
- Brandt in 2024
- Born: March 14, 1973 (age 53); Bay City, Michigan, U.S.
- Education: University of Illinois (BFA); Harvard University (MFA)
- Occupation: Actress
- Years active: 1998–present
- Spouse: Grady Olsen (m. 1998; sep. 2023)
- Children: 2

Betsy Brandt (born March 14, 1973) is an American actress. She is best known for portraying Marie Schrader in the crime drama series Breaking Bad (2008–2013), receiving three Screen Actors Guild Award nominations as part of the cast, with one win. She also appears in the sitcoms The Michael J. Fox Show (2013–2014) and Life in Pieces (2015–2019), the miniseries Soulmates (2020), and the psychological drama series Saint X (2023).

== Early life ==
Brandt was born in Bay City, Michigan, on March 14, 1973. She is of German descent. She graduated from Bay City Western High School in Bay City, Michigan, in 1991. She earned a BFA in acting from the University of Illinois at Urbana–Champaign in 1996. She earned an MFA at Harvard University's Institute for Advanced Theater Training and studied abroad at the Royal Scottish Academy of Music and Drama.

== Career ==
In theater, Brandt has acted in Much Ado About Nothing with the Arizona Theatre Company, with the San Jose Repertory Theatre, Beth Henley's Ridiculous Fraud, Julia Cho's The Language Archive with South Coast Repertory, and Next Fall with Geffen Playhouse.

Brandt has had guest roles on the television shows Without a Trace, Judging Amy, ER, Boston Legal, The Practice, and NCIS.

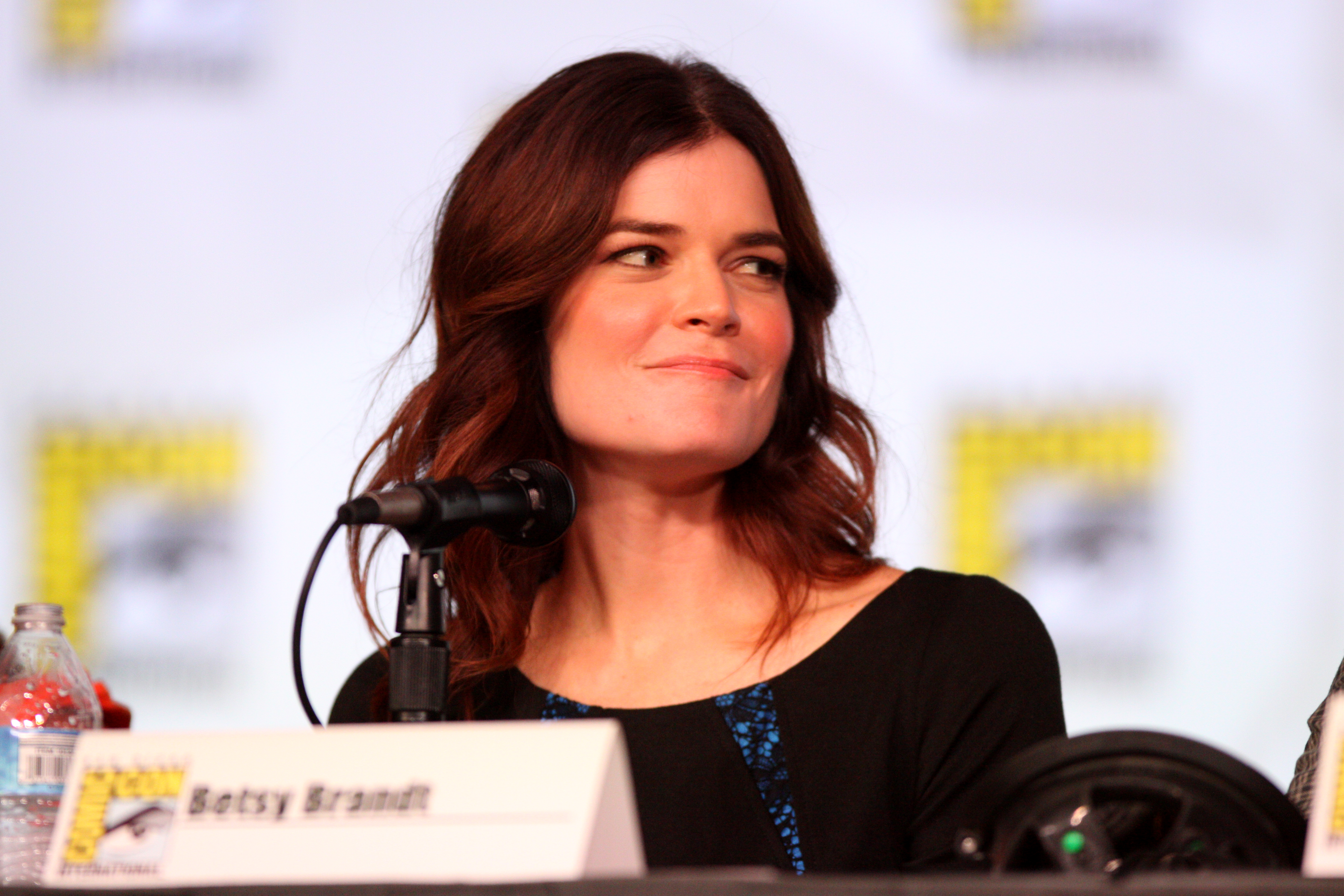
Brandt at the 2012 San Diego Comic-Con

From 2008 to 2013, Brandt portrayed Marie Schrader in the AMC drama series Breaking Bad. She auditioned for three different roles before being offered the part of Marie. She described her character as "an unpleasant bitch", but also stated that there was more to her than that. "I think we're seeing more of it now that she would be there for her family. But it's all about her." She reprised her role for the Better Call Saul series finale "Saul Gone" in 2022.

In 2012, she was cast as Sandy in Parenthood. Brandt was cast as Annie Henry on The Michael J. Fox Show, which premiered in September 2013. Her performance was met with positive reviews.

In 2014, Brandt was cast as one of the lead characters in the ABC series Members Only created by Susannah Grant, but the series did not go forward. From 2015 to 2019, she starred as Heather Short Hughes in the CBS comedy series Life in Pieces. The series was cancelled after four seasons.

In 2020, Brandt was cast as Cleo in the pilot episode of the NBC sitcom Jefferies, created by Jim Jefferies and Suzanne Martin. To date, the pilot remains unaired.

== Personal life ==
Brandt married fellow UIUC graduate Grady Olsen in September 1998. They have two children together. They separated in August 2023 and she filed for divorce in December 2024.

== Filmography ==
=== Film ===
Year	Title	Role	Notes
1998	Confidence	Natasha	Short film
2001	Memphis Bound...and Gagged	The Director	
2001	The Red Boot Diaries	Rachel	Short film
2004	Subhuman	Nikki Reynolds	Also known as Shelf Life
2005	All Features Great and Small	Jennifer	Short film
2011	Jeremy Fink and the Meaning of Life	Madame Zaleski	
2012	Magic Mike	Banker	
2013	The Professor	The Professor	Short film
2016	Between Us	Gigi	
2016	Claire in Motion	Claire	
2018	Anywhere with You	Jeanine	
2019	Straight Up	Topanga	
2020	Run Sweetheart Run	Judy	
2022	The Valet	Kathryn Royce	

=== Television ===
Year	Title	Role	Notes
2001	Judging Amy	Elizabeth Granson	Episode: "Imbroglio"
2002	JAG	Leslie Rosenbaum	Episode: "The Promised Land"
2003	ER	Franny Myers	Episode: "Death and Taxes"
2003	Without a Trace	Libby Coulter	2 episodes
2003	The Guardian	Sofia Trokey	Episode: "The Intersection"
2004	NCIS	Petty Officer Barbara Swain	Episode: "The Good Wives Club"
2004	The Practice	Lynda Hobbs	Episode: "Adjourned (AKA Cheers)"
2004	Back When We Were Grownups	Nono	Television film
2005	Medical Investigation	Karen Banks	Episode: "Ice Station"
2006	CSI: Crime Scene Investigation	Dawn Hanson	Episode: "Burn Out"
2006	Close to Home	Karen Randall	Episode: "Reasonable Doubts"
2007	Boston Legal	Gwen Richards	Episode: "Hope and Gory"
2007	Side Order of Life	Sara Rose	Episode: "Aliens"
2008–2013	Breaking Bad	Marie Schrader	Main role
2010	The Whole Truth	Sister Theresa Bendicta	Episode: "Thicker Than Water"
2010	Miami Medical	Dana	Episode: "Medicine Man"
2011	No Ordinary Family	Dr. Lena Hopkins	Episode: "No Ordinary Double Standard"
2011–2012	Private Practice	Joanna Gibbs	2 episodes
2012–2015	Parenthood	Sandy	Recurring role; 7 episodes
2012	Fairly Legal	Natalie Roberts	Episode: "Shattered"
2013	Body of Proof	Susan Hart	Episode: "Eye for an Eye"
2013–2014	The Michael J. Fox Show	Annie Henry	Main role
2014	Masters of Sex	Barbara	Recurring role; 7 episodes
2014	Members Only	Leslie Holmes	Pilot
2014	Mothers of the Bride	Haley Snow	Television film
2015–2019	Life in Pieces	Heather Hughes	Main role
2016	American Dad!	Nurse Jocelyn	Voice role; episode: "Stan-Dan Deliver"
2017	FANatic	Tess Daniels	Television film
2017	Flint	LeeAnne Walters	Television film
2019	Pearson	Stephanie Novak	Recurring role; 6 episodes
2019–2021	The Unicorn	Caroline	Recurring role; 5 episodes
2020	Soulmates	Caitlen	Recurring role
2020	A Million Little Things	Colleen	Episode: "'Til Death Do Us Part"
2020	Jefferies	Cleo	Unaired pilot
2021–2022	Love, Victor	Dawn Westen	Recurring role
2022	Better Call Saul	Marie Schrader	Episode: "Saul Gone"
2023	Accused	Kara	Episode: "Jessie's Story"
2023	Saint X	Mia Thomas	Main role
2024	The Bad Orphan	Jessica	Television film
2025	Law & Order: Special Victims Unit	Dr. Gretchen Stewart	Episode: Post-Rage

== Theatre ==
- The Language Archive — Mary; South Coast Repertory, 2010
- Ridiculous Fraud — South Coast Repertory, 2006
- Much Ado About Nothing — Arizona Theatre Company
- Control+Alt+Delete — San Jose Repertory Theatre
- Thirst — A Contemporary Theatre
- The Little Foxes — Intiman Theatre
- The Royal Family (play) — Intiman Theatre
- Next Fall — Holly; Geffen Playhouse, 2011
- The Sisters Rosensweig — Pfeni Rosensweig; South Coast Repertory, 2018

== Awards and nominations ==
Awards and nominations received by Betsy Brandt
Award	Year (Note: Indicates the year of ceremony. Each year is linked to the article about the awards held that year, wherever possible.)	Category	Nominated work	Result	Ref.
Critics' Choice Television Awards	2021	Best Supporting Actress in a Movie/Miniseries	Soulmates	Nominated	
Screen Actors Guild Awards	2012	Outstanding Performance by an Ensemble in a Drama Series	Breaking Bad	Nominated	
Screen Actors Guild Awards	2013	Outstanding Performance by an Ensemble in a Drama Series	Breaking Bad	Nominated	
Screen Actors Guild Awards	2014	Outstanding Performance by an Ensemble in a Drama Series	Breaking Bad	Won	
