= Walter White Jr. =

Fictional character from Breaking Bad

- Breaking Bad character
- RJ Mitte as Walter White Jr.
- First appearance: "Pilot"; January 20, 2008
- Last appearance: "Felina"; September 29, 2013
- Created by: Vince Gilligan
- Portrayed by: RJ Mitte

In-universe information
- Full name: Walter Hartwell White Jr.
- Alias: Flynn White
- Nicknames: "Junior"; Emo McGee (by Hank)
- Gender: Male
- Occupation: Student
- Family: Walter White (father); Skyler White (mother); Marie Schrader (aunt); Hank Schrader (uncle by marriage); Holly White (younger sister)
- Home: 308 Negra Arroyo Lane, Albuquerque, New Mexico, United States
- Date of birth: July 8, 1993

Walter Hartwell White Jr., also known as Flynn White, is a fictional character portrayed by RJ Mitte in the American crime drama series Breaking Bad. Walt Jr. is the son of protagonist Walter White and his wife Skyler. He has cerebral palsy, as manifested in speech difficulties and impaired motor control, for which he uses crutches. His younger sister is Holly White.

== Character biography ==
=== Season 1 ===
Walter Hartwell White Jr. is the teenage son of chemistry teacher Walter White Sr. and writer Skyler White, and has cerebral palsy. When Skyler tells her sister Marie Schrader that she is working on a new short story with a stoner character in it, she asks her about marijuana. Marie assumes that Skyler thinks Walter Jr. is smoking pot, but Skyler insists that she was just talking about her story. Marie asks her husband Hank, a DEA agent, to scare Walter Jr. straight. Hank brings Walter Jr. to a motel to show how meth has corroded the teeth of a prostitute. After Walter White reveals to Hank, Marie, and Walter Jr. that he has cancer, a fact he already shared with Skyler before, Jr. berates him for acting weird and nonchalant about his cancer. He also becomes upset at his father's decision of not choosing chemotherapy. Over the weekend, Jr. and two friends are waiting outside a convenience store, waiting for somebody to buy them beer. The friends run away when Jr. approaches an off-duty cop. The cop tells him he got his "first and last warning." At an intervention held by Skyler for Walt, Hank, Jr., and Marie argue over what to do. While Skyler and Jr. want him to take the treatment, Marie, and later Hank, feel Walt should be given the choice to decline the treatment if he wants; Walt ends the intervention by saying he will not do the treatment.

=== Season 2 ===
Jr. and Skyler are disturbed when Walt cheerily makes breakfast despite his condition. Hoping to reconnect with his son, Walt offers to give Jr. a driving lesson while Skyler is out. Jr. shows his skill at driving, but Walt notices that he is using both feet to work the pedals. When Walt tries to get him to only use the right foot, Jr. gets upset and accidentally hits a safety cone. Around this time, Jr. adopts a new alias: "Flynn". Jr. later creates a website so that people can donate to his father's cancer surgery, unaware that Walt lives a double life as meth kingpin Heisenberg and has enough money which he does not want to reveal to his family. Walt's lawyer Saul Goodman arranges for a wave of fictional "donations" drawn from Walt's drug money, in order to launder it and also make Jr.'s efforts appear successful. Jr.'s website gains media attention due to its apparent success; Walt is uncomfortable in the spotlight.

=== Season 3 ===
Skyler and Walt separate. Jr., given no explanation by either parent, assumes that Skyler has inexplicably thrown his terminally ill father out of the house, and he takes his father's side. He later experiences severe difficulty understanding why his mother (who already knows about Walt's double life) refuses to let Walt back in, eventually snapping at her over dinner. Jr. goes to visit his father, who also does not tell him the truth, eventually calling Skyler about his whereabouts. Walt takes his son home, where he tries to appease Skyler with pizza, to no avail. After Walt moves back into the house and tells Skyler he has no intention of leaving, Jr. is thrilled that his father is back, while Skyler's attempt to have Walt thrown out fails.

=== Season 4 ===
When Jr. tells his father that Skyler already set the date for Walt to move back in, he is unnerved. Walt tells his son he is not moving back home and buys a flashy new Dodge Challenger car for him, but when Skyler comes back she demands Walt return it, lest he blow his cover. Rather than return Jr.'s car, Walt takes it on a joyride, crashes it, and blows it up. On Jr.'s birthday, Walt never arrives to help Skyler present his birthday gift, a Chrysler PT Cruiser which he is less than excited about. Concerned about his father, Jr. pays him a visit, only to find him bloodied and on painkillers and alcohol. Concealing his fight with Jesse Pinkman, Walt blames it on gambling; he tearfully apologizes but later accidentally calls Jr. "Jesse" before drifting off to sleep. The next morning, Walt finds Jr. on his couch and apologizes for his drugged state, saying he does not want to be remembered that way after he is gone. However, Jr. seems to be more satisfied with his father's apparent truthfulness than with his double life for the past year. Gus Fring, for whom Walt works, takes him to the desert and fires him, informing him that Hank will be killed and that Walt's entire family, including Jr., will be murdered if he interferes. Skyler, Jr. and his sister Holly go under DEA protection at Hank and Marie's home. Jr. later watches a news report about Fring's death, unaware that his father caused it.

=== Season 5 ===
After Skyler, Jr., and Holly return home, Jr. explains that Fring's illicit activities are the subject of a media frenzy and that the DEA believes the danger against Hank and Marie has abated. Walt and Jr. retrieve Walt's Pontiac Aztek from an auto repair shop. Walt impulsively sells the Aztek to the mechanic for $50, leases a new Chrysler 300 for himself, and later leases a new Dodge Challenger for Jr. Jr. remains oblivious to his father's criminal activities until Marie (who already knows, along with Hank, and is confident that Walt is in Hank's custody) forces Skyler to reveal the whole truth to her son. Upon learning of his father's connection with Hank's death, Jr. mistakenly concludes that he killed Hank. Feeling betrayed, Jr. calls 911 when Walt fends off Skyler's knife attack, forcing Walt to leave and eventually end up on the most wanted list. Disillusioned by his father's criminal activities, Jr. adopts the "Flynn" alias permanently. Months later, Walt learns that Skyler and Flynn have left their house for a small apartment. He telephones Flynn and says that he is going to send money to Flynn's friend Louis, who should give it to Flynn, who should give it to Skyler. An enraged Flynn refuses, tells his father to die soon, and hangs up. Walt coerces Gretchen and Elliott Schwartz to place his remaining $9.72 million in a trust fund for Flynn. The next day, after visiting Skyler for the final time, before leaving Walt solemnly watches from afar as Flynn arrives home from school, accepting the fact that he wants nothing more to do with his father.

Series creator Vince Gilligan speculated in an interview that after the events of the series, the character is likely writing a book about his father.

== Concept and creation ==
Walt Jr., portrayed by RJ Mitte, was modelled on a friend of creator Vince Gilligan who also had cerebral palsy and required crutches. When asked why so much of the character's screen time is shown in scenes eating breakfast, Gilligan commented that his "love of breakfast indeed seems to know no bounds". Walt Jr.'s Flynn alias was derived from actor Errol Flynn. Mitte said the character is much like his real self since they were roughly the same age, had the same type of attitude, and "mostly like to be treated the same way". Like the character, Mitte too had cerebral palsy, but a milder variation, and did not use crutches. He stated he had to regress from his therapy to portray the character, staying up late into the night to slur his speech and learning to walk on crutches so his walking would not look fake. He drew inspiration from people having cerebral palsy he knew from Shriners Hospital, Shreveport, and named the fictional character Forrest Gump as his "representation". The website that Walt Jr. creates to collect donations for his father's cancer treatment also exists as a real website, and as of 2013 the donations made to this website were directed to the National Cancer Coalition. Gilligan had plans for Walt Jr. to be killed off early in the series, much like Jesse Pinkman. Mitte himself said he wanted the character to be "bludgeoned and beaten to death". When conceiving the story for El Camino: A Breaking Bad Movie, Gilligan considered including Walt Jr., feeling that his inclusion would have been great, but ultimately desisted from the idea due to his feelings that the film should focus only in the most important characters in Jesse's life, which Walt Jr. was not.

== Reception ==
At the 2013 Media Access Awards, Mitte received the SAG-AFTRA Harold Russell Award for his portrayal of Walter White Jr. in the series.

== Other appearances ==
Mitte voiced Walt Jr. in an episode of Robot Chicken titled "Food" where he comedically raps about his character's supposed love for breakfast.
