= Marie Schrader =

Fictional character from Breaking Bad and Better Call Saul

- Breaking Bad character
- Betsy Brandt as Marie Schrader
- First appearance: "Pilot"; Breaking Bad; January 20, 2008
- Last appearance: "Saul Gone"; Better Call Saul; August 15, 2022
- Created by: Vince Gilligan
- Portrayed by: Betsy Brandt

In-universe information
- Full name: Marie Lambert Schrader
- Alias: Tori Costner| Charlotte Blattner
- Occupation: Radiologic technologist
- Family: Walter White (brother-in-law); Skyler White (sister); Walter White Jr. (nephew); Holly White (niece)
- Spouse: Hank Schrader (deceased)
- Home: Albuquerque, New Mexico, United States
- Nationality: American

Marie Lambert Schrader (née Lambert) is a fictional character portrayed by Betsy Brandt in the American crime drama series Breaking Bad. She is Skyler White's sister, Hank's wife, and Walter White's sister-in-law.

In the series, Marie works as a radiologic technologist. She does not hesitate to offer advice to others but often fails to practice what she preaches. She shoplifts compulsively—apparently a manifest symptom of kleptomania—a behavior for which she sees a therapist. She appears self-centered and shallow but cares deeply for her husband and her sister's family. Nearly all of her household and clothing items are shades of the color purple. Brandt returned to the role in a guest appearance in the series finale of the spin-off series Better Call Saul.

== Character biography ==
=== Breaking Bad ===
==== Season 1 ====
Born Marie Lambert, she is a radiologic technologist, and lives with her husband Hank, a DEA agent, in Albuquerque, New Mexico. Walter White (husband of Marie's older sister Skyler) learns that he has lung cancer, but initially keeps this from his family, along with Marie and Hank. Once Walt reveals this to Marie, Hank and his son Walter Jr., Marie tells Skyler (who already knows) about lining up an "oncology dream team". After Walt initially refuses treatment, Marie sides with him. At Skyler's baby shower, Marie presents her with an expensive white gold baby's tiara, much to Hank's irritation. Skyler goes to return the tiara and realizes that Marie stole it. She returns and confronts Marie about the theft, but Marie calmly denies it.

==== Season 2 ====
Skyler later refuses to answer phone calls from Marie. Marie and Hank argue about whether or not she attempted to schedule a dinner with Skyler in a way that conflicts with another appointment that she has for therapy, revealing that Marie reluctantly goes to therapy for unspecified problems. Hank visits Skyler and asks her to make up with Marie. Skyler responds angrily, stating that her situation is worse than her sister's. Hank and Skyler both realize that the other knows about Marie's kleptomania. At a cookout celebrating Hank's promotion, Skyler demands that Marie apologize for giving Skyler the stolen tiara, or it will irreversibly drive a wedge between them; Marie tearfully does so. After Hank is left with post-traumatic stress disorder, having barely escaped a bombing, Marie becomes a major source of comfort and support to him.

==== Season 3 ====
After an unarmed Hank is nearly killed by The Cousins, and left in critical condition with four gunshot wounds, Marie berates Hank's boss and partner when she hears they had taken his gun away (due to a battery charge), leaving him defenseless. Marie is at a loss about what to do when she learns that their health plan will not provide the quantity and the quality of physical therapy Hank requires to fully recover the use of his legs. Skyler proposes that she and Walt pay the bills, claiming that they can afford it because Walt has become a successful gambler (hiding the fact that Walt is a drug kingpin), to which Marie agrees. At the hospital, Marie is thrilled at the prospect of Hank's returning home, but he does not seem as pleased. She later wheels him out of the hospital after winning a bet where she gives him a handjob during a sponge bath.

==== Season 4 ====
Hank struggles with life at home after his injury, snapping at Marie and becoming more preoccupied with collecting and cataloging minerals; Marie struggles to maintain her composure while caring for her belligerent husband. Days later, Marie continues struggling to deal with Hank's deepening depression as he copes with physical therapy from having been shot. The bedridden and bitter Hank constantly ignores or insults Marie and, even after celebrating a successful session with his physical therapist, he refuses to share any of that excitement with Marie. Frustrated by Hank's continuous cold shoulder, Marie resumes her kleptomania; she starts stealing objects from real-estate open houses, most notably a small souvenir spoon. She also makes up elaborate stories about who she is, but is eventually caught by a real estate agent. A livid Hank pulls strings with a senior police officer to get her out of being charged.

==== Season 5 ====
While discussing Walt's upcoming 51st birthday with Marie, Skyler begins to light a cigarette. As Marie begins to confront her about smoking, Skyler screams "shut up" repeatedly and suffers a nervous breakdown. Marie confronts Walt at home about Skyler's breakdown and demands to know the truth. Walt tells her about Skyler's affair with Ted Beneke and that her breakdown was due to stress over his recent (Note: During the events of "Crawl Space".) accident. As Walt and Skyler have marital problems, Marie volunteers to take in their children – Walter Jr. and Holly – for a couple of days while they work things out. While visiting Holly, a tearful Skyler is tempted to confess to Marie about Walt's criminal activities, but stops short when Marie discloses her knowledge of Skyler's affair with Ted. Marie mistakenly believes this to be the reason for Skyler's mental anguish. Marie later encourages Skyler to reconcile with Walt.

Hank, having discovered Walt's criminal activities, shares this with Marie, and she confronts Skyler. Learning Skyler knew of Walt before Hank was shot, Marie slaps her sister and storms out of the room. She tries to take Holly with her, but Hank commands her to return the baby. She then tells Hank to apprehend Walt. Marie helps Hank try to stop Walt and Skyler, but their attempts are thwarted when Walt makes a DVD framing Hank. Marie is eager to help Hank when Jesse Pinkman agrees to confess about Walt's crimes. After Hank is killed by Jack Welker, she is initially unaware of his death and reconciles with Skyler on the condition she tells Walter Jr. everything. Marie learns that Hank is missing when Walt kidnaps Holly, and eventually receives confirmation he is dead. While Walt goes into hiding, Jack's gang raids Marie's house and finds Jesse's confession tape, leading to Marie being sent to a safe house. Months later, Marie informs Skyler over phone that Walt has returned. However unknown to Marie, Walt is in the same room as Skyler.

=== Better Call Saul ===
==== Season 6 ====
Two months after Walt's death that day, Marie appears as a witness against Walt's former lawyer Saul Goodman when he is finally arrested after spending months hiding from the police. She accuses him of contributing to Hank's murder and leaves disgusted when the prosecutor shows a willingness to negotiate with him. Marie attends Saul's court appearance, where Saul confesses to enabling Walt, and is convicted.

== Concept and creation ==
In February 2007, Betsy Brandt was cast in Breaking Bad in the main cast. She described Marie as a "bitch" when the character is first introduced, but noted that eventually the audience would realize there is more to her. She also has personal experiences having a much older sister that she compared to Marie and Skyler's relationship. Depicting Marie as a radiologic technologist was Brandt's idea; she did not want Marie to be a doctor or a nurse, but a medical professional. Throughout the series, Marie is almost always shown wearing the color purple, which creator Vince Gilligan explained is symbolic of her being misled; for example, Walt and Skyler were deluding Marie about who was behind the drug business. When asked if the scene where Marie learns Walt's criminal activities almost lead to Hank's death in the third season pushed her "over the edge", Brandt replied, "That they in any way would be willing to jeopardize Hank's life and then lie to her about it – that's a lot to swallow. The big watershed moment was Marie finding out that Walt and Skyler were willing to do that. It would be hard enough [finding out] that only Walt knew. But the fact that Skyler knew and just watched Marie worry about Hank's safety and not tell her? That's just painful."

Gilligan revealed that he wanted to have Marie make a cameo appearance in the Better Call Saul season two finale "Klick", but the writer's room objected, considering the idea to be distracting for audiences. When conceiving the story for El Camino: A Breaking Bad Movie, Gilligan considered including Marie, feeling that her inclusion would have been great, but ultimately desisted from the idea due to his feelings that the film should focus only in the most important characters in Jesse's life, which Marie was not. Marie ultimately appeared in "Saul Gone", the finale of Better Call Saul.

== Analysis ==
Writer Brad Klypchak linked Marie's kleptomaniac behavior to the emotional emptiness of material abundance. In the Breaking Bad finale, Marie is shown wearing black-and-white instead of her usual purple; according to Screen Rant's Matthew Wilkinson, this symbolizes her grief.

== Legacy ==
"Marie's Purple Cake" was a real dessert item offered at the "Breaking Bad Experience" pop-up that opened in Los Angeles in 2019 during the premiere of El Camino: A Breaking Bad Movie.

In 2023, American Power-Pop band Scoopski released a song called "I Agree, Marie" about Marie Schrader's kleptomania tendencies. The song was praised by Betsy Brandt.
