= Skyler White =

Fictional character in the television series Breaking Bad

- Breaking Bad character
- Anna Gunn as Skyler White
- First appearance: "Pilot"; January 20, 2008
- Last appearance: "Felina"; September 29, 2013
- Created by: Vince Gilligan
- Portrayed by: Anna Gunn

In-universe information
- Nickname: Sky
- Gender: Female
- Occupation: Short story writer; Accountant; Car wash manager; Taxi dispatcher
- Spouse: Walter White
- Children: Walter White Jr. (son); Holly White (daughter)
- Relatives: Marie Schrader (sister); Hank Schrader (brother-in-law)
- Home: 308 Negra Arroyo Lane, Albuquerque, New Mexico, United States
- Date of birth: August 11, 1969

Skyler White (née Lambert) is a fictional character portrayed by Anna Gunn in the American crime drama television series Breaking Bad. Skyler is married to protagonist Walter White. For her performance, Gunn received critical acclaim. She won two Primetime Emmy Awards for Outstanding Supporting Actress in a Drama Series, in 2013 and 2014, and has received 3 nominations.

== Character biography ==
Over the years, Skyler has had several meager sources of income: working as a bookkeeper for the Albuquerque firm Beneke Fabricators, writing short stories, and selling items on eBay. She and her husband, Walter White, have a son, Walt Jr., who has cerebral palsy, and an infant daughter, Holly (Elanor Anne Wenrich). Her younger sister, Marie, is married to a Drug Enforcement Administration (DEA) agent, Hank Schrader. Skyler is 11 years younger than Walt, whom she met when she was a hostess at a diner near Walt's former place of work, near the Los Alamos National Laboratory.

=== Season 1 ===
Skyler is in the middle stages of pregnancy with Holly at the beginning of the show. When Walt is diagnosed with terminal lung cancer, he does not tell his family at first. When Skyler learns about the diagnosis, she is both devastated by the news and upset that Walt withheld the information. Their relationship becomes strained, both from Walt's reluctance to seek treatment and from his unexplained absences following his diagnosis. When she confronts Walt, he claims that Jesse is his marijuana dealer. Skyler figures out Walt's connection to his former student, Jesse Pinkman and confronts Jesse at his house. Unbeknownst to Skyler, Walt has taken up cooking methamphetamine with Jesse to ensure his family's financial security after he dies. Skyler faces other problems as well. When Marie offers an expensive white gold tiara as a gift for Holly's baby shower, Skyler attempts to return it to the jewelry store, only to learn that her sister, a kleptomaniac, had stolen the item. Skyler is detained by the store's owner and escapes arrest only after faking labor pains. The incident causes serious problems in Skyler's relationship with Marie, who emphatically denies that she has done anything wrong.

=== Season 2 ===
When Walt is kidnapped by Mexican drug lord Tuco Salamanca, his family, unaware of the connection to Walt's criminal activities, organizes a search for him as a missing person. When Walt escapes, he fakes a "fugue state", claiming to have no memory of the last few days. The marriage continues going downhill because of Walt's absences, devolving to the point where Skyler refuses to speak to him. Skyler is also perturbed by Walt's resistance to his son's efforts to raise money for Walt's cancer treatments, unaware that most of the donations actually constitute drug money laundered by Walt's corrupt lawyer, Saul Goodman.

Still unaware of Walt's meth business, Skyler believes his illness has strained the family's finances and returns to her old job working as an accountant for Ted Beneke, whose sexual advances had earlier caused her to quit. She increasingly relies on Ted for emotional support as her husband grows distant; she also reluctantly covers up Ted's tax fraud. Shortly afterwards, Skyler gives birth to Holly; Walt is absent for the occasion, having been forced to appear for a meth transaction with Gus Fring.

When Skyler becomes suspicious that Walt owns a second cell phone, Walt emphatically denies it. While Walt is medicated prior to cancer surgery, he indicates the opposite by replying, "Which one?", when Skyler asks if he has packed his cell phone. After Walt recovers, Skyler confronts him about that and leaves him when he lies about it.

=== Season 3 ===
In the third season, Walt has moved out of the house. Skyler appears at his apartment, having deduced that he is in the drug trade. When she confronts Walt with her idea that he is selling marijuana, he corrects her and admits that he is a meth cook. Skyler demands a divorce in exchange for her silence about Walt's criminal activities. Skyler's rationale for remaining silent is two-fold: She does not want her children to find out about their father's double life, and she fears that Walt's arrest could ruin Hank's career as a DEA agent. She also demands that Walt move out of the family's home. When Walt defiantly moves back in, Skyler retaliates by initiating an affair with Ted and coldly informing her husband that she cheated on him.

Even as her marriage crumbles, Skyler permits Walt to take care of Holly and defends some of his actions to her lawyer, who advises that she leave Walt immediately. She later finds that Walt has signed off on their divorce and left the house for good. When Ted arrives at her home and tries to clarify the nature of Skyler's feelings, she refuses to answer and asks him to leave.

After Hank is shot during a failed hit by the Mexican cartel, Skyler tells Marie that Walt earned millions through card counting at underground blackjack games and offers to pay for Hank's physical therapy. She later admits to Walt that she never filed the divorce papers, slowly beginning to work her way into his criminal activities by reminding him about spousal privilege that they cannot be forced to testify against each other. Skyler suggests Walt should launder his drug money by purchasing the car wash facility where he used to work, and offers to handle the books.

=== Season 4 ===
Skyler buys the car wash and begins laundering Walt's drug money. She and Walt eventually have sex for the first time in months, and slowly begin to rebuild their relationship. At the same time she begins to fear him and worries that her children are in danger. At one point, she is so consumed with panic that she considers fleeing with Holly. When Ted is gravely injured during an encounter with Walt's associates, she feels responsible, having used Walt's drug money to pay off Ted's back taxes and then sent two of Saul's enforcers to ensure he did not use it for anything else, leading to the injury. As a side-effect of Skyler's actions with Ted, Walt is left without the money to pay Saul's "disappearer" to take the family to a new life. Later, when Hank and Marie are under protective custody at their house, Skyler, Holly and Walter Jr. join them. When she sees on the news that Gus Fring has been killed, she makes a panicked phone call to Walt, who calmly informs her that he has "won"; she then realizes that Walt killed him.

=== Season 5 ===
==== Part 1 ====
Following Gus' death, Skyler becomes terrified of Walt, as well as the prospect of going to prison as his accomplice. She breaks down in front of Marie at the car wash and falls into a deep state of depression. During a tense dinner with Hank and Marie, she stages a suicide attempt to convince the Schraders to temporarily take custody of the children. With them gone, Skyler makes it plain to Walt that she will do anything she can to keep them out of the house until his lung cancer kills him. Walt explains her emotional distress to the Schraders as the effect of serious marital discord, and he exposes Skyler's affair with Ted in the process. This taints Skyler's relationship with Marie; While she continues to launder money through the car wash, her attitude towards Walt devolves into a barely concealed hatred. Skyler eventually brings Walt to a storage locker packed with millions of dollars in cash, convincing him to get out of the drug business, as they now have more money than they will ever need.

==== Part 2 ====
When Hank deduces that Walt is a drug lord, he goes to Skyler under the assumption she was forced to keep quiet, but she refuses to give evidence. When Hank tells Marie, she meets with Skyler and is outraged to learn Skyler knew about Walt's activities before Hank was shot. Marie threatens to take Holly with her but leaves the baby behind at Hank's insistence. When Hank is killed after arresting Walt, Skyler, believing Walt to be the killer, demands that he leave their house and threatens him with a knife. A physical altercation ensues which is ended by Walter Jr., who calls 911. Walt responds by taking his daughter Holly, ignoring Skyler's desperate pleas for him to stop. That evening, Walt calls Skyler, as the police monitor the call, and exonerates her of his misdeeds under the guise of an angry tirade. He then leaves Holly at a fire station so that she could be returned to Skyler. As a national manhunt is launched for Walt, Skyler is questioned by federal prosecutors about his whereabouts. One of Walt's associates, Todd Alquist, and his gang break into the White home and threaten to kill Skyler and her children if she talks.

A few months later, Walt learns that Skyler works as a taxi dispatcher and is using her maiden name; no court date has been set. Skyler and her children have moved out of the house, which is now abandoned. After Walt is sighted in Albuquerque, Marie calls her sister to warn her, although Walt is already at the home. Walt has a long talk with Skyler, who is still angry at him but did not disclose he was there to Marie and makes no moves to contact law enforcement. Walt admits that he did not kill Hank and will be seeking revenge against those that did and stole his drug money. When she thinks Walt is going to give her his remaining drug money (which he actually forced the Schwartzes to launder for him) she tells him she and Flynn (the name Walter Jr. prefers) made it clear they don't want it and Walt technically tells the truth by saying "I spent all of it getting here." When Walt seems like he is going to once again claim he entered the meth business to provide for the family, Skyler gets angry, but is left stunned and silent when Walt admits that he entered the drug business for his own gratification. Walt then gives her a lottery ticket with the coordinates of the makeshift grave in which Hank and Steve Gomez are buried to use as leverage for striking a deal with the prosecutors. Skyler then allows Walt to see Holly one last time before he leaves.

=== Post-Breaking Bad ===
Two months after the events of Breaking Bad, Francesca Liddy uses a payphone to receive a call from Saul Goodman, who had been hiding under the name Gene Takavic in Omaha, Nebraska. Francesca tells him that Skyler received a deal from the authorities in exchange for the GPS coordinates of the bodies of Hank and Gomez, as Walt had hoped.

Series creator Vince Gilligan speculated in an interview that after the events of the series, Skyler found a better romantic partner and is living a happier life.

== Reception ==
For her performance as Skyler, Anna Gunn received critical acclaim. For her portrayal, Gunn won two consecutive Primetime Emmy Awards for Outstanding Supporting Actress in a Drama Series in 2013 and 2014. In 2014, her performance in the episode "Ozymandias" was named as one of the best performances on television on various critics lists. She also won the Screen Actors Guild Award for Outstanding Performance by an Ensemble in a Drama Series in 2014.

The character drew an extremely negative reception from some viewers, and Gunn was often subject to social media criticism and bullying. The online harassment and threats became so bad that Gunn became concerned for her own physical safety, prompting her to write an op-ed published in The New York Times describing some of these incidents.

Matt Zoller Seitz of Vulture considers her to be the Breaking Bad equivalent of Better Call Saul character Chuck McGill, a character that received similar disdain from audiences.
