= Gliding Over All =

- Breaking Bad episode
- Episode no.: Season 5 Episode 8
- Directed by: Michelle MacLaren
- Written by: Moira Walley-Beckett
- Cinematography by: Michael Slovis
- Editing by: Kelley Dixon
- Original air date: September 2, 2012
- Running time: 47 minutes

Guest appearances
- Laura Fraser as Lydia Rodarte-Quayle; Jesse Plemons as Todd Alquist; Steven Michael Quezada as Steven Gomez; Michael Bowen as Jack Welker; Kevin Rankin as Kenny; Mike Batayeh as Dennis Markowsky; Chris Freihofer as Dan Wachsberger; Russ Dillen as Ron Forenall

Episode chronology
| ← Previous "Say My Name" | Next → "Blood Money" |
- Breaking Bad season 5

"Gliding Over All" is the eighth episode and mid-season finale of the fifth season of the American television drama series Breaking Bad, and the 54th overall episode of the series. Written by Moira Walley-Beckett and directed by Michelle MacLaren, it aired on AMC in the United States on September 2, 2012.

The episode is named after poem 271 in Walt Whitman's Leaves of Grass, a book that is featured prominently in the series.

== Plot ==
At Vamonos Pest, Walter White and Todd prepare a barrel of hydrofluoric acid to dispose of Mike Ehrmantraut's dead body. When Jesse Pinkman arrives, Walt informs him that Mike is "gone." When asked by Jesse how they will deal with Mike's nine henchmen now that they will not be receiving their hazard payments, Walt coldly tells Jesse that, having quit, he is no longer involved in the business, and matters will be handled without him.

Walt meets with Lydia Rodarte-Quayle at a coffee shop to obtain the names of Mike's henchmen. Suspecting that Walt will see her as a liability and kill her, Lydia proposes a partnership in which Walt expands his distribution overseas to the Czech Republic, which has a high percentage of meth users. When Walt agrees with her proposal, Lydia provides him with the names. After Lydia leaves, Walt removes his hat from the table, revealing a hidden vial of ricin presumably meant to poison her. Walt then hides the vial in his house.

Walt asks Todd to meet with his uncle, Jack Welker, a high-ranking Aryan Brotherhood gangster. Walt enlists Jack and his men to kill Mike's incarcerated henchmen, insisting that they be killed simultaneously. Though Jack tries to explain that the operation will be logistically difficult, an unfazed Walt orders him to "figure it out." When Walt's order is eventually carried out, the ten are killed in a period of less than two minutes, and across three prisons. While Walt visits his house, Hank reminisces about a job he had tagging trees to be knocked down as a young man, wishing that he could have a job that did not involve "chasing monsters".

For the next few months, Walt's meth empire runs profitably and uninhibited, raking in millions of dollars. Meanwhile, Marie Schrader encourages Skyler White to reconcile with Walt. Later, Skyler brings him to an enormous pile of money she has been collecting and maintaining in a storage unit. After explaining to a stunned Walt that there is simply too much money to launder through their car wash, Skyler asks him how much money will be enough before she can have her former life with their children back. Later, Walt tells Skyler that he will quit. Walt visits Jesse and the two reminisce about the simpler days of cooking meth in the RV. Before he leaves, Walt leaves behind two bags. Fearing for his safety, Jesse unzips the bags slowly, only to find them filled with cash. Relieved, he disposes of a gun he had been concealing during the visit.

Walter White Jr. and Holly White move back in with Walt and Skyler, and the family seems to be in repair, with everything now going well for Walt. During lunch by the pool with Hank and Marie, Hank leaves to use the bathroom. Rummaging for reading material, he finds Walt's copy of Walt Whitman's Leaves of Grass under some magazines in the bathroom, the same copy given to Walt by Gale Boetticher. As he thumbs through the pages of the book, Hank finds a handwritten note by Gale referring to Walter as his "other favorite W.W." Seeing that the handwriting of the two documents match, including in the characters "W.W.", Hank finally realizes that Walter is Heisenberg.

== Production ==
This episode features several nods to earlier episodes, such as the fly at the beginning of the episode (referencing "Fly"), the painting Walt stares at during the planning of the prison murders (the same painting from "Bit by a Dead Bee"), the damaged paper towel dispenser (caused by Walt punching it in "4 Days Out") in the restroom of Walt's cancer clinic, and Lydia telling Walt "We're gonna make a lot of money together," reiterating Tuco Salamanca's quote from the first season finale. Walt tells Lydia "Learn to take yes for an answer," which is exactly the same advice Mike gave him in the bar ("Thirty-Eight Snub"). Series creator Vince Gilligan saw the ending somewhat as Gale's "poetic justice from beyond the grave."

It was estimated that the pile of money measured 6 ft × 3 ft × 2 ft and that Skyler would have not needed a storage unit until she had upwards of $10 million. In "Ozymandias", Walt tells Jack Welker that the buried pile equals $80 million; however, Gilligan expressed his doubts during an earlier podcast:

"I asked prop master Mark Hansen, and he and his guys had tried, just for their own edification, to figure out how much that would be if it was roughly a half-and-half mix of twenties and fifties, and he guessed somewhere in the vicinity of eighty million dollars—eighty, eighty-five, ninety—that's a lotta dough. I don't know, we may have erred on the side of showmanship there instead of reality, I don't know if [Walt] could've made that much that quickly."

According to Peter Gould, the episode originally featured a scene where Walt is told by his doctor that his cancer is still in remission. However, the scene was cut so that Walt's current state would be left ambiguous.

== Reception ==
=== Ratings ===
"Gliding Over All" was watched by 2.78 million viewers and received a 1.3 rating among viewers aged 18–49.

=== Critical reception ===
TV Fanatic's Matt Richenthal gave it a 4.8 out of 5 star rating, stating: "'Gliding Over All' still managed to shock, taking Walt to a place I never imagined he'd be prior to the big reveal: contentment. Happiness. A sense of satisfaction over a job well done, an emperor who no longer needed an empire." Richenthal particularly liked the two montages showing the prison hits and the time-lapse. Alan Sepinwall of HitFix called the episode "an absolutely gorgeous piece of work, in both the visual sense and the way it brought us to the next, final phase of Walter White's story."

This episode was nominated for three Primetime Emmy Awards. Michelle MacLaren was nominated for the Primetime Emmy Award for Outstanding Directing for a Drama Series for directing this episode. Kelley Dixon won Outstanding Single-Camera Picture Editing for a Drama Series, and Michael Slovis was nominated for Outstanding Cinematography for a Single-Camera Series (One Hour).

In 2019, The Ringer ranked "Gliding Over All" as the 13th best out of the 62 total Breaking Bad episodes.
