= Buyout (Breaking Bad) =

- Breaking Bad episode
- Episode no.: Season 5 Episode 6
- Directed by: Colin Bucksey
- Written by: Gennifer Hutchison
- Cinematography by: Michael Slovis
- Editing by: Kelley Dixon
- Original air date: August 19, 2012
- Running time: 47 minutes

Guest appearances
- Jesse Plemons as Todd Alquist; Steven Michael Quezada as Steven Gomez; Louis Ferreira as Declan; Kaija Roze Bales as Kaylee Ehrmantraut; Samuel Webb as Drew Sharp

Episode chronology
← Previous "Dead Freight"	Next → "Say My Name"
- Breaking Bad season 5

"Buyout" is the sixth episode of the fifth season of the American television drama series Breaking Bad, and the 52nd overall episode of the series. Written by Gennifer Hutchison and directed by Colin Bucksey, it originally aired on AMC in the United States on August 19, 2012.

== Plot ==
After returning from the train heist, Walter White, Mike Ehrmantraut, and Todd Alquist destroy Drew Sharp's body and his dirt bike. Todd casually dismisses the killing, leading an incensed Jesse Pinkman to punch him. After a heated debate, Walt, Jesse, and Mike agree to spare Todd's life and keep him on the payroll with Vamonos Pest.

The DEA begins to surveil Mike which prompts him to withdraw from Walt's meth operation, and Jesse follows, distraught about Drew's death. Mike plans to sell the methylamine to a rival dealer, Declan, which would net them $5 million each. Walt refuses to sell, believing its potential worth to be up to $300 million after being turned into meth. When Mike and Jesse later go to sell their shares, Declan calls off the deal realising only two thirds of the methylamine is being sold, and that purchasing it won't remove Walt's meth from the market.

While visiting Holly, a tearful Skyler White is tempted to confess to her sister Marie Schrader, but stops short when Marie discloses her knowledge of Skyler's affair with Ted Beneke. Marie mistakenly believes the affair to be the reason for Skyler's mental anguish.

Jesse comes to Walt's house to try to change Walt's mind. Walt refuses to sell, telling Jesse he sold his 33.33% share of Gray Matter Technologies for $5,000 and the company went on to be worth over $2 billion. He tells Jesse he does not see their enterprise as a drug business but as the building of an empire. Skyler arrives home and Walt insists that Jesse stay for dinner, leading to an awkward meal. Afterwards, Walt confesses to Jesse that his relationship with Skyler is broken and she is keeping his children from him, and so his drug business is all he has.

Walt tries to hide the methylamine, but Mike anticipates the move and restrains Walt in the Vamonos Pest offices. Mike and Saul Goodman meet with Hank Schrader and Steve Gomez at the DEA to notify them that Mike has obtained an injunction preventing their continued surveillance of him. Walt frees himself and hides the methylamine. When Mike arrives, he threatens to kill Walt but Jesse interrupts and tells Mike that Walt has a plan to get all three of them their money.

== Reception ==
=== Ratings ===
"Buyout" was watched by 2.81 million viewers and received a 5 rating among viewers aged 18–49.

=== Critical reception ===
Donna Bowman of The A.V. Club gave it an A rating and called it a "standout episode" for how it "shows Walter offering up two sides of the truth of his life." Seth Amitin, writing for IGN, rated the episode 8.5 out of 10, adding that he "love[s] that this show still deals with the emotional impact of [the characters'] own messes." However, Sean T. Collins of Rolling Stone felt the episode "stumbled" when it came to "compelling drama in which everyone involved acts in character and within the bounds of recognizable, reasonable human behavior." HitFix's Alan Sepinwall thought "Buyout" was "a bit more muddled" when compared to the previous episodes, adding, "There are incredible individual components — the pre-credits sequence, Walt's improvised blowtorch, even another awkward meal at the White house — but they didn't entirely work together."

Aaron Paul was nominated for the Primetime Emmy Award for Outstanding Supporting Actor in a Drama Series for his performance in this episode.

In 2019 The Ringer ranked "Buyout" 42nd out of the 62 total Breaking Bad episodes.
