= Felina (Breaking Bad) =

- Breaking Bad episode
- Walter White succumbs to his wounds and dies in Jack's meth lab.
- Episode no.: Season 5 Episode 16
- Directed by: Vince Gilligan
- Written by: Vince Gilligan
- Cinematography by: Arthur Albert; Michael Slovis
- Editing by: Skip Macdonald
- Original air date: September 29, 2013
- Running time: 55 minutes

Guest appearances
- Matt Jones as Badger; Charles Baker as Skinny Pete; Michael Bowen as Jack Welker; Kevin Rankin as Kenny; Adam Godley as Elliott Schwartz; Jessica Hecht as Gretchen Schwartz

Episode chronology
← Previous "Granite State"	Next → —
- Breaking Bad season 5

"Felina" is the series finale of the American crime drama television series Breaking Bad. Written and directed by series creator Vince Gilligan, it is the sixteenth episode of the fifth season and the 62nd overall episode of the series. It first aired on AMC in the United States and Canada on September 29, 2013.

The plot involves Walter White evading a nationwide manhunt for him in order to return to New Mexico and deliver the remaining profits from his illegal methamphetamine empire to his family, as well as tie up loose ends with his friends and enemies. Knowing his lung cancer will soon kill him, Walt revisits his family and former acquaintances to settle his affairs and prepare for his death.

Upon airing, "Felina" received critical acclaim, and is considered one of the greatest series finales of all time. It was followed by a sequel film, El Camino: A Breaking Bad Movie, which was made available on Netflix on October 11, 2019.

== Plot ==
Walter White steals a car, returns to New Mexico, and breaks into the home of Gretchen and Elliott Schwartz. He claims he hired hitmen, while Badger and Skinny Pete scare them with laser pointers that spoof rifle sights. Walt coerces them into placing his remaining $9.72 million in a trust for Walter Jr. He pays Badger and Pete, who tell him that blue meth is still distributed, leading him to deduce that Jesse Pinkman is still alive.

Walt retrieves the ricin from his abandoned house, (Note: Originally shown as a flashforward in "Blood Money") connects an M60 machine gun (Note: Originally shown as a flashforward in "Live Free or Die") to a pivoting turret in the trunk of the car he is now driving, and rigs it to a remote unlock button. He interrupts Todd and Lydia's coffee shop meeting and offers what he claims is a formula for methylamine-free meth. Lydia feigns interest so Walt will meet Jack, knowing Jack will kill him.

Marie calls Skyler to warn her Walt is in Albuquerque. Walt is already with Skyler and he leaves her the lottery ticket containing the coordinates for Hank Schrader and Steve Gomez's grave, (Note: As depicted in "Buried") which he advises her to use to obtain a favorable plea bargain. Walt admits that despite claiming he produced meth to provide for his family, he did it to gratify himself. Skyler allows Walt to see a sleeping Holly and he later watches from afar as Walter Jr. arrives home from school.

Walt parks alongside the headquarters building of Jack's compound, and Jack orders him killed. Walt accuses Jack of partnering with Jesse. Angered at the suggestion he is in league with a rat, Jack orders that Jesse be brought from Jack's meth lab so he can prove Jesse is a captive. Walt tackles Jesse and triggers the machine gun, which kills all of Jack and Todd's associates. Jesse strangles Todd with his shackles, then frees himself with Todd's keys. Jack pleads for his life, but Walt shoots him dead. A grievously wounded Walt tells Jesse to kill him. Jesse says if Walt wants to die he should do it himself.

Walt answers Todd's phone and informs an ill Lydia that she will soon die because he poisoned her coffee shop stevia. Jesse and Walt exchange a farewell nod before Jesse flees in Todd's El Camino. Walt admires Jack's lab before succumbing to his wound. Police rush in as he lies motionless, a slight smile on his face.

== Production ==
On September 18, 2013, it was announced that both "Granite State" and "Felina" would run 75 minutes, including commercials. The actual runtime of the episodes is 55 minutes. The episode was written and directed by Breaking Bad creator Vince Gilligan.

During writing the fifth and final season, other uses for Walter White's machine gun that were considered were having him use it against police officers or using it to free Jesse Pinkman from prison (or prison escort). The ending involving the shootout with police was scrapped because "it just didn’t seem right." The idea of Walt using it to commit suicide was briefly considered. Another proposed plotline was Walt using the gun against the neo-Nazis "in Rambo fashion", commandeering the gun himself instead of using the rotary device in the trunk of his car.

=== Title reference and music ===
The episode title, "Felina", is an anagram of the word "finale." It is also inspired by the character Feleena from the song "El Paso" by Marty Robbins, which is featured throughout the episode.

The story of "El Paso" closely mirrors Walter White's character arc in the final season of Breaking Bad. Walt, who has become a notorious criminal, flees from Albuquerque, living as a fugitive. Despite this being a successful outcome in the context of the story, he finds himself increasingly isolated and dissatisfied. Because his desire for emotional closure outweighs his fear of capture and death, he is eventually driven to return to the scene of his crimes, where he finds the closure he seeks but ultimately meets his end. "El Paso" is on a Marty Robbins cassette in Walt's car, and is played during the episode. Additionally, Walt sings the song to himself while building his machine gun turret. The writers changed the subject's name from Feleena to Felina so that, when used as the title, it could serve as an anagram of finale.

Badfinger's "Baby Blue" is played during the final scene. According to series creator Vince Gilligan, this is a reference to the high-quality blue meth Walt had produced over the previous seasons and his life as a drug kingpin which the main character, at last, recognizes he had enjoyed. According to Rolling Stone, the music supervisors on the show disagreed with Gilligan's choice for the final song; however, music supervisor Thomas Golubić stated that "journalists sometimes try to create drama where there isn't any" and that his quotes were "mis-represented". "Baby Blue" became an obvious choice as the editing came closer to completion, with Golubić describing the process of finalizing the song:

"Before I saw the scene, I pulled together a number of ideas – one which I thought worked pretty beautifully against picture: The Bees' 'No More Excuses' – but once I saw that beautiful shot, and saw the scene in context, I realized why Vince was so strongly attached to the Badfinger song. It's tricky for us as music supervisors in that we keep pulling together ideas and revising them. None of us know the right answer until we are at the very end of that process and have cut and locked picture to work with. Vince is just really talented at knowing what the final effect he is looking for, and knew early on that Badfinger's 'Baby Blue' was the right choice for what he was looking to do. It took until the final picture was assembled that I was able to also see what a fantastic choice it was."

=== El Camino ===
After the conclusion of the series, Gilligan had considered Jesse's fate, stating that rather than getting caught by police, he had envisioned that Jesse would end up in Alaska to start his life anew. He had mulled this idea over for some years, and as the tenth anniversary of Breaking Bad neared, became interested in producing a work to follow Jesse's fate after this episode. This ultimately resulted in the film El Camino: A Breaking Bad Movie, which first aired on Netflix on October 11, 2019, and had limited theatrical runs that weekend. El Camino, named for the car Jesse escapes in, takes place immediately after the events of "Felina", and was considered by Gilligan to be a coda to the overall series to close out Jesse's story. Aaron Paul returned to star as Jesse, and the film includes brief appearances by Bryan Cranston, Jonathan Banks, Jesse Plemons, Robert Forster, Matt Jones, Krysten Ritter and Charles Baker.

== Release and reception ==
"Felina" first aired on AMC on September 29, 2013. In the United States, "Felina" had the highest ratings of any Breaking Bad episode, with 10.28 million viewers watching the episode during its original broadcast, including a 18–49 rating of 5.3. It generated millions of online comments and Nielsen Holdings rankings established that it was the most-discussed episode on Twitter for that week. The popularity of the episode resulted in a 2,981 percent increase of sales of the Badfinger song "Baby Blue", which features prominently in the ending sequence, as well as a 9,000 percent increase in streaming over Spotify.

Upon airing, the episode received critical acclaim. A round-up of critical reviews by Metacritic assessed 25 reviews as "extremely positive", 19 as "positive", and four as "mixed/so-so". It is considered one of the greatest series finales of all time. In her review of "Felina", Donna Bowman of The A.V. Club gave the episode an A rating, writing that "Walt's purpose is fulfilled, and he just stops". Seth Amitin at IGN also praised the episode, calling it "fully satisfying" and awarding it a score of 9.8 out of 10. Katey Rich agreed with these sentiments, calling the episode "a deeply satisfying and surprisingly emotional finale". However, Emily Nussbaum, writing in the New Yorker, criticized the episode, claiming it so neatly wrapped up the series in Walt's favor that it seemed more like "the dying fantasy on the part of Walter White, not something that was actually happening". In 2019, The Ringer ranked "Felina" as the 19th best out of the 62 total Breaking Bad episodes.

=== Accolades ===
This episode was nominated for six Primetime Emmy Awards. Vince Gilligan was nominated for Outstanding Directing for a Drama Series and Outstanding Writing for a Drama Series for directing and writing this episode, losing the latter to Moira Walley-Beckett for "Ozymandias". Skip Macdonald won Outstanding Single-Camera Picture Editing for a Drama Series, Darryl L. Frank, Jeffrey Perkins, and Eric Justen were nominated for Outstanding Sound Mixing for a Comedy or Drama Series (One-Hour), Greg Nicotero, Howard Berger, Tarra D. Day, Stephan Dupuis, and Steve LaPorte were nominated for Outstanding Prosthetic Makeup for a Series, Limited Series, Movie or Special, and Kurt Nicholas Forshager, Kathryn Madsen, Jason Tregoe Newman, Mark Cookson, Cormac Funge, Jane Boegel, Jeffrey Cranford, Tim Boggs, Gregg Barbanell, and Dominique Decaudain were nominated for Outstanding Sound Editing for a Comedy or Drama Series (One-Hour).
