= Breaking Bad season 5 =

Fifth season of the AMC crime drama television series

Breaking Bad
- Season 5
- Region 1 DVD covers for The Fifth Season and The Final Season.
- Showrunner: Vince Gilligan
- Starring: Bryan Cranston; Anna Gunn; Aaron Paul; Dean Norris; Betsy Brandt; RJ Mitte; Bob Odenkirk; Jonathan Banks; Laura Fraser; Jesse Plemons
- No. of episodes: 16

Release
- Original network: AMC
- Original release: July 15, 2012 – September 29, 2013

Season chronology
- ← Previous; Season 4

The fifth and final season of the American television drama series Breaking Bad premiered on July 15, 2012, and concluded on September 29, 2013, on AMC in the United States and Canada. The 16-episode season is split into two parts, each comprising eight episodes. The first part of the season was broadcast from July 15 to September 2, 2012, and aired on Sundays at 10:00 p.m. ET. The second part was broadcast from August 11 to September 29, 2013, and aired on Sundays at 9:00 p.m. ET. It debuted in the United Kingdom and Ireland on Netflix, showing one day after the episodes aired in the United States and Canada. Part 1 was released on region 1 DVD and region A Blu-ray on June 4, 2013, and part 2 was released on November 26, 2013.

After receiving three nominations for seasons two, three, and four, both halves of season five won the Primetime Emmy Award for Outstanding Drama Series in 2013 and 2014. The second half of the season also won the Golden Globe Award for Best Television Series – Drama, British Academy of Film and Television Arts for Best International Programme and the Screen Actors Guild Award for Outstanding Performance by an Ensemble in a Drama Series in 2014. The entire season was met with unanimous acclaim, particularly for its second half. The season received a Metacritic score of 99 out of 100, leading to the show being listed in Guinness World Records as the most acclaimed television series in history.

== Cast ==
=== Main ===
- Bryan Cranston as Walter White, a terminally ill man who cooks meth to provide for his family, though he tries to distance himself from the criminal life.
- Anna Gunn as Skyler White, Walt's wife.
- Aaron Paul as Jesse Pinkman, Walt's former student and assistant with his meth production who turns against him.
- Dean Norris as Hank Schrader, Walt's brother-in-law who is the Assistant Special Agent in Charge of the Albuquerque DEA office who learns about Walt's crimes.
- Betsy Brandt as Marie Schrader, Skyler's sister and Hank's wife.
- RJ Mitte as Walter White, Jr., Walt and Skyler's teenaged son with cerebral palsy.
- Bob Odenkirk as Saul Goodman, a sleazy lawyer who helps hide Walt's crimes.
- Jonathan Banks as Mike Ehrmantraut (Season 5A only), one of Saul's associates who used to work for Gus Fring before he was killed. He helps Walt continue his meth production.
- Laura Fraser as Lydia Rodarte-Quayle (main, Season 5B; recurring Season 5A), Gus' former business associate who helps distribute Walt's meth into Europe.
- Jesse Plemons as Todd Alquist (main, Season 5B; recurring Season 5A), a psychopathic former pest exterminator who becomes involved with Walt's crimes.

=== Recurring ===
- Steven Michael Quezada as Steven Gomez, Hank's partner at the DEA.
- Michael Bowen as Jack Welker, Todd's uncle who is the leader of a Neo-Nazi gang.
- Kevin Rankin as Kenny, Jack's right-hand-man.
- Lavell Crawford as Huell Babineaux, an associate of Saul's.
- Charles Baker as Skinny Pete, one of Jesse's friends.
- Bill Burr as Patrick Kuby, an associate of Saul's.
- Louis Ferreira as Declan, a drug kingpin from Phoenix, Arizona.
- Chris Freihofer as Dan Wachsberger, an attorney who represents nine of Gus Fring's former employees who can identify Walt as Heisenberg.
- Matt L. Jones as Badger Mayhew, one of Jesse's friends.
- Emily Rios as Andrea Cantillo, a young mother and Jesse's girlfriend.
- Mike Batayeh as Dennis Markowski, one of Dan's clients who was the manager of Gus' laundromat.
- Adam Godley as Elliott Schwartz, Gretchen's husband and Walt's former business partner and friend.
- Jessica Hecht as Gretchen Schwartz, Elliott's wife and Walt's former business partner and friend and ex-fiancée.
- Jim Beaver as Lawson, an arms dealer who sells Walt a machine gun.
- Christopher Cousins as Ted Beneke, Skyler's former boss whom she also had an affair with who's in the hospital from a horrible accident.
- Larry Hankin as Old Joe, a junkyard owner who helps Walt, Jesse and Mike with destroying Gus' laptop.
- Carmen Serano as Principal Carmen Molina, the principal of J.P. Wynne High School, Walter Jr.'s principal, and Walt's former boss.
- Michael Shamus Wiles as ASAC George Merkert, the former head of the Albuquerque DEA office and Hank and Gomez's former boss, who's let go of his position because of his friendship with Gus Fring.
- Tina Parker as Francesca Liddy, Saul's secretary.

== Episodes ==
No. overall	No. in season	Title	Directed by	Written by	Original release date	U.S. viewers (millions)
Part One
47	1	"Live Free or Die"	Michael Slovis	Vince Gilligan	July 15, 2012	2.93
In a flashforward, a ragged, bearded Walt, living under a different identity, has breakfast at a Denny's restaurant in Albuquerque on his 52nd birthday. He pays for and receives a key from a patron, which he uses to open a car trunk containing an M60 machine gun. In the present, Walt disposes of any evidence connecting him to Gus' killing and Brock's poisoning as news of the three deaths at the senior center Casa Tranquila spreads. Walt heads over to see his family, but Skyler privately tells Walt that she is now afraid of him. Upon realizing that the surveillance cameras that Gus installed in the superlab could incriminate him, Walt uses a giant magnet to destroy evidence of his and Jesse's activities stored on Gus' laptop in the police evidence lockup. At the hospital, Skyler visits an intimidated Ted, who tells her he will remain silent about what caused his injury. Saul is upset with Walt for poisoning Brock and tries to cut ties with him, but Walt intimidates him into continuing their business arrangement.
48	2	"Madrigal"	Michelle MacLaren	Vince Gilligan	July 22, 2012	2.29
Peter Schuler, an executive at Madrigal, the parent company of Los Pollos Hermanos, electrocutes himself using an automated external defibrillator to avoid questioning about his ties to Gus Fring. The DEA filters through various leads in hopes of finding something. In order to rebuild their lives and form a new profitable drug business, Walt and Jesse decide to look to Mike as a new partner. Mike refuses, explaining that Walt is a dangerous "time bomb," but soon learns that a Cayman Islands account Gus set up for Mike's granddaughter has been frozen by the DEA. Walt hides the vial of ricin behind an electrical outlet cover in his house and creates a fake one, which he plants in Jesse's Roomba; Jesse finds it and tearfully apologizes to Walt for suspecting him of poisoning Brock. Skyler's mental state continues to deteriorate due to Walt's criminal activity. Madrigal executive Lydia Rodarte-Quayle hires an assassin to kill off Gus' and Mike's former employees who can incriminate her, including the latter. Mike thwarts this plan and almost kills Lydia, but relents and instead asks her to continue supplying methylamine to Walt.
49	3	"Hazard Pay"	Adam Bernstein	Peter Gould	July 29, 2012	2.20
Walt moves back into the house, to Skyler's dismay. Walt, Mike, and Jesse meet with Saul to discuss finding a new place to cook. Walt suggests using pest removal business Vamonos Pest as a cover, cooking in the houses that have been tented over; Saul explains that the Vamonos crew runs a secret burglary operation. Walt manipulates Jesse into ending his relationship with Andrea, mentioning the problems it would cause if she discovered his secret life. At the car wash, Skyler experiences a mental breakdown in front of Marie, who confronts Walt to demand an explanation for Skyler's behavior. Walt tells Marie about Skyler's affair with Ted, and relates her breakdown to stress over Ted's recent accident. When it comes time to divide the earnings of their first cook, Walt is upset about the amount of money going to Mike's former men, whose assets were seized when they were arrested. Angered that he is making less than what he was making while working for Gus, Walt hints to Jesse that they may need to get rid of some of the other members of the team.
50	4	"Fifty-One"	Rian Johnson	Sam Catlin	August 5, 2012	2.29
Lydia offers up her own employee to the DEA and Mike offers her a replacement: Jesse. Together, she and Jesse spot a tracking device on a barrel of methylamine. Mike is skeptical that the tracker was planted by the DEA because of its crude placement, and believes that Lydia placed the device herself to get out of their deal. Hank receives a promotion to ASAC. Skyler's depression and frustration begins to grow more severe. During a meager celebration for Walt's 51st birthday, a fully-clothed Skyler steps into the pool and slowly submerges herself before Walt pulls her out. Walt then learns that Skyler has asked Marie and Hank to look after the kids until her issues with Walt are resolved. Skyler threatens to further harm herself if Walt brings the kids back home, but he belittles her plans and threatens to have her institutionalized. Realizing there is no way out of her situation without hurting her family, Skyler tells Walt that her only option is to hope that Walt's cancer will come back and kill him.
51	5	"Dead Freight"	George Mastras	George Mastras	August 12, 2012	2.48
Walt bugs Hank's new office, after which they learn that the tracking device was actually placed by a DEA team in Houston. As all the barrels in Lydia's warehouse are now compromised, the team begins to work through several ideas to obtain methylamine from another source. Desperate to avoid being killed, Lydia convinces the trio that they could heist a tremendous amount of methylamine from a transiting train. Todd, a Vamonos Pest employee, helps assist in the operation; Jesse informs Todd that no one must find out about the heist under any circumstances. Walt Jr. arrives at the White house to demand an audience, but Walt sends him away. Skyler informs Walt that she has decided to keep his secrets and continue laundering his money, so long as their children remain away from them; Walt agrees. The train heist goes almost as smoothly as planned, but Todd notices Drew, a young boy, stopping by on his dirt bike and witnessing the operation. Todd immediately shoots and kills Drew, much to Jesse's horror.
52	6	"Buyout"	Colin Bucksey	Gennifer Hutchison	August 19, 2012	2.81
Following Drew's killing and new developments with the DEA, Jesse and Mike decide to quit. Mike strikes a deal to sell the methylamine to another drug dealer, Declan, but Walt refuses to cooperate, preventing Jesse and Mike from selling their shares. Walt invites Jesse to his home and confides to him his regret about selling his share of Gray Matter and his plans to build another empire. Skyler returns home; the three dine together at Walt's request, during which Skyler openly discusses her affair. Afterward, Walt discloses to Jesse that Skyler is awaiting his death, and that the meth business is all he has left. Mike and Saul meet with the DEA to notify them that Mike has obtained an injunction preventing their continued surveillance of him. Walt hides the methylamine from Mike to sabotage the deal with Declan. When Mike finds out, he threatens to kill Walt, but the latter suggests he can strike a better deal that would let him keep the business running.
53	7	"Say My Name"	Thomas Schnauz	Thomas Schnauz	August 26, 2012	2.98
Walt, Jesse, and Mike meet with Declan so Walt can negotiate a deal: Declan will distribute Walt's meth. Jesse still wants to quit the business, so Walt employs Todd as his assistant. Told to end his pursuit of Mike, Hank instead follows Dan Wachsberger, the lawyer who is laundering Mike's money. After Jesse demands his cut of the deal so he can leave, Walt attempts to manipulate him into staying and refuses to pay him. Dan gives in to the DEA, but Walt finds out and warns Mike. When they meet, Walt demands that Mike tell him the names of the people in prison whose silence Mike has been paying for. Mike refuses and berates Walt, telling him they could have kept working for Gus if Walt hadn't ruined that with his pride and ego. Insulted, Walt shoots him in a fit of anger. Horrified by his own action, Walt realizes he could have just gotten the names from Lydia. The two watch the sunset on the riverbank as Mike succumbs to his wound.
54	8	"Gliding Over All"	Michelle MacLaren	Moira Walley-Beckett	September 2, 2012	2.78
Walt meets with Lydia to obtain the names of Mike's associates. Lydia partners with him to expand his distribution overseas to the Czech Republic. Walt takes the names to Todd's uncle, Jack Welker, who has ties with Aryan Brotherhood prison gangs. Mike's lawyer and the nine prisoners are killed under Walt's orders. The meth production runs profitably for months. Skyler makes another effort to convince Walt to give up his criminal life, and Walt ultimately relents after realizing they now have more money than can even be counted. Walt visits Jesse to pay him his cut of the deal with Declan, and the two reminisce about the simpler days of cooking meth in the RV. The Whites' children move back in. During a family cookout, Hank flips through Leaves of Grass in Walt's bathroom; he sees the dedication from Gale Boetticher and realizes that Walt is Heisenberg.
Part Two
55	9	"Blood Money"	Bryan Cranston	Peter Gould	August 11, 2013	5.92
In a flashforward, Walt arrives at his dilapidated and fenced-off abandoned house to retrieve a hidden vial of ricin. In the present, Hank excuses himself from the party at Walt's house and suffers a panic attack while driving home. He then requests all files of the Fring case and matches the handwriting in Walt's copy of Leaves of Grass with that of Gale, confirming that Walt is Heisenberg. Jesse feels guilty over his role in Walt's meth business, particularly over Drew and Mike's deaths, and he throws his money away in a residential neighborhood. Lydia visits the car wash pleading for Walt's help, as the quality of the meth has fallen below acceptable standards since his retirement; Skyler firmly warns her never to come back. Walt's cancer returns, but he keeps the news a secret from his family. Upon finding his copy of Leaves of Grass missing, Walt immediately searches for and finds a GPS tracker on his car. Suspecting that Hank has now uncovered the truth, Walt confronts Hank, who punches him and accuses him of being Heisenberg. Walt warns Hank to "tread lightly".
56	10	"Buried"	Michelle MacLaren	Thomas Schnauz	August 18, 2013	4.77
An elderly man collects the money that Jesse threw away and discovers him absentmindedly spinning on a merry-go-round. Hank reaches Skyler before Walt and, understanding her to be a victim, tries enlisting her in building a case against Walt; Skyler refuses to talk and leaves. Skyler also refuses to say anything incriminating when Marie visits, only saying "I'm so sorry". Realizing Skyler knew about Walt's activities before Hank was shot, Marie slaps her and tells Hank that he "has to get" Walt. Walt buries his money in the desert at the Tohajiilee Indian Reservation. He offers to surrender himself on the condition that the money be kept for their children, but Skyler advises that they should keep quiet, as Hank has no evidence. Lydia, facing pressure from her Czech Republic customers, tries to convince Declan to use Todd as his chemist. When Declan refuses, Jack's gang kills him and his associates before taking the meth production equipment. Hank, unable to obtain information from Skyler or Walt, returns to his office at the DEA to learn that Jesse is being detained and questioned.
57	11	"Confessions"	Michael Slovis	Gennifer Hutchison	August 25, 2013	4.85
Jesse refuses to cut a deal with Hank, and is released after Saul shows up. Walt and Skyler arrange a public meeting with Hank and Marie to negotiate; Walt warns Hank that the investigation will ruin their whole family, while Skyler states that Walt is no longer part of his empire. When Hank makes it clear that he will not back off, Walt leaves Hank and Marie with a DVD of Walt implicating Hank as the mastermind of the methamphetamine business, and that he forced Walt to cook meth for him. Hank also learns that Marie paid for his physical therapy using Walt's drug money, lending credence to Walt's story and torpedoing Hank's credibility. Walt offers Jesse money to leave town for good and assume a new identity. Jesse agrees, until he discovers that Saul took the ricin cigarette from him so that Walt could frame Gus for poisoning Brock. Jesse flies into a rage, breaks into the White home, and douses it with gasoline.
58	12	"Rabid Dog"	Sam Catlin	Sam Catlin	September 1, 2013	4.41
Walt finds Saul's car crashed in his driveway and his house unoccupied and doused in gasoline; he leaves a message on Jesse's voicemail to meet in order to explain himself, and concocts a fabrication about a pump malfunction at the gas station. Upon discovering that Jesse had tried to burn down their house, Skyler pushes Walt to kill Jesse, whom she views as a threat to their safety. Marie discusses her issues with Walt with her therapist, but is hesitant to disclose the full extent of his criminality. Jesse agrees to cooperate with Hank, who is revealed to have stopped Jesse from torching Walt's house; Hank videotapes Jesse's confession as he recounts his history with Walt. Since there is no physical evidence, Hank convinces Jesse to meet with Walt while wearing a wire. Jesse backs down at the last minute and instead threatens Walt through a phone call. Hank berates Jesse for blowing the plan, but Jesse reveals that he has a better strategy in mind. Meanwhile, Walt calls Todd to request another hit from his uncle.
59	13	"To'hajiilee"	Michelle MacLaren	George Mastras	September 8, 2013	5.11
Walt asks Todd to negotiate a hit on Jesse; Jack agrees on the condition that Walt cooks one more time so that Todd can observe him, which Walt reluctantly agrees to do. Hank attempts to learn the whereabouts of Walt's money through Huell, whom he detains; Saul reports Huell's disappearance to Walt. Walt attempts to lure Jesse out of hiding by having Andrea call him, but Hank intercepts the message. Aware that Walt has buried his money somewhere, Hank stages a photo to convince Walt that Jesse found the money. Walt panics and frantically drives to To'hajiilee, where the money is buried, pleading with Jesse by phone not to burn the money, and unintentionally confessing to various murders. Walt calls Jack and demands that he and his crew come to his rescue. Upon seeing Hank and Gomez with Jesse, however, he orders them off. Walt surrenders, but Jack and his crew arrive. A shootout ensues between Jack's crew and Hank and Gomez.
60	14	"Ozymandias"	Rian Johnson	Moira Walley-Beckett	September 15, 2013	6.37
Jack and his team remain unscathed while Gomez lies dead and Hank has been shot in the thigh. Walt begs Jack not to kill Hank, offering Jack $80 million in exchange for Hank's life. Nonetheless, Jack executes Hank and his men dig up all seven barrels, leaving one for Walt. At Todd's suggestion, they take Jesse hostage in order to get information from him about how much he told the DEA. After being beaten and tortured for information, Jesse is forced by Todd to help him cook meth. Marie tells Skyler that Hank has Walt in custody, and forces her to tell Walt Jr. the truth. When they return home, they find Walt packing and insisting the family leave immediately. Realizing Hank is dead, Skyler threatens Walt with a knife, demanding he leave the house. When Walt refuses and approaches Skyler, she slashes his hand and a tussle ensues. As Walt gains the upper hand, Walt Jr. comes to the defence of his mother and calls the police on Walt, who escapes with Holly. After taking full responsibility for the meth business during a call to Skyler that is monitored by the police, he leaves Holly at a fire station and assumes a new identity through Saul's contact.
61	15	"Granite State"	Peter Gould	Peter Gould	September 22, 2013	6.58
Assisted by Saul's contact Ed, Walt relocates to a cabin in New Hampshire while Saul leaves for Nebraska. Ed cautions that Walt risks capture if he leaves the cabin. Meanwhile, Jack's gang raids Marie's house and finds Jesse's confession tape. After being interrogated by the DEA, Skyler is threatened by Todd not to talk about Lydia. Jesse tries to escape from the Aryan Brotherhood's compound but is caught. As punishment, Jesse is taken to Andrea's house in a van and forced to watch Todd murder her. Months later, a disheveled and lonely Walt leaves the cabin and walks into town. He calls Walt Jr. from a pay phone in a bar, but an enraged Walt Jr. blames him for Hank's death and hangs up the phone after wishing death upon his father. Walt then calls the DEA to turn himself in. While sitting at the bar, Walt watches Charlie Rose interview Elliott and Gretchen and becomes incensed when they deny the significance of Walt's contributions to Gray Matter. The police soon encircle the bar, but Walt has already left.
62	16	"Felina"	Vince Gilligan	Vince Gilligan	September 29, 2013	10.28
Walt locates Gretchen and Elliott and gives them $9,720,000 to give to Walt Jr. when he turns 18. He claims that he has hired hitmen should they fail to do so, who turn out to be Badger and Skinny Pete with laser pointers whom Walt paid to intimidate Gretchen and Elliott. Walt crashes a meeting between Lydia and Todd, putting the ricin in Lydia's stevia. He then visits Skyler and gives her the coordinates of Hank and Gomez's burial site, imploring her to use it to bargain for a plea deal, and admitting he produced meth to gratify himself. Walt drives to the Aryan Brotherhood's headquarters with the M60 machine gun which he has jury rigged in the trunk. When Jack brings Jesse in from cooking to show him to Walt, Walt tackles Jesse to the ground and triggers the M60, which mortally wounds Walt and kills everyone else except for Todd, whom Jesse strangles to death, and Jack, whom Walt shoots in the head. Jesse refuses to shoot Walt, though Walt asks him to. When Lydia calls Todd, Walt answers and informs her within earshot of Jesse about the poisoned stevia. Walt and Jesse acknowledge each other one final time before Jesse escapes in Todd's car, crying in joy. As he succumbs to his gunshot wound, Walt spends his last moments gazing around the meth lab before collapsing and dying. The police find his body in the lab moments later.

== Development and production ==
In July 2011, series creator Vince Gilligan indicated that he intended to conclude Breaking Bad with the fifth season. In early August 2011, negotiations began over a deal regarding the fifth and possibly final season between AMC and Sony Pictures Television, the production company of the series. AMC proposed a shortened fifth season (six to eight episodes, instead of thirteen) to cut costs, but the producers declined. Sony then approached other cable networks about possibly picking up the show if a deal could not be made. On August 14, 2011, a deal was made in which AMC renewed the series for a final 16-episode season. Filming for the season began on March 26, 2012. In April 2012, Bryan Cranston revealed that the final season would be split into two halves, with the first half airing in 2012 and the second in 2013. After a four-month break, filming for the second half of the season began on December 7, 2012, during which AMC sent the cast and crew cupcakes decorated with characters and props used throughout the show's run.

Vince Gilligan explained that the season was split at his request in order to have more time to write the final episodes. Thomas Schnauz revealed that the writers initially tried to conceive a 16-episode arc in advance of completing the first eight episodes, but that most of these plans were scrapped as new plot points emerged "that threw everything into a little bit of chaos."

Dean Norris had asked Gilligan to kill off Hank during the first half of the season after being cast in a comedy pilot. However, Gilligan declined his request, citing the importance of Hank in the final eight episodes.

Gilligan stated that the introduction of the M60 machine gun in the season's first episode created several problems down the line in writing. When the premiere script was developed, the machine gun was written in as a thought-provoking idea to suggest to the audience that something significant was going to happen later in the season and draw them in. However, at that time, they did not plan out how the gun would be used, and Gilligan believed that with sixteen episodes, they would be able to figure something out. As Gilligan started writing the last four to five episodes, his staff reminded him about the machine gun. Gilligan was of a mind to simply drop the machine gun but realized this would not work. He eventually had a eureka moment where Walter would need to use the machine gun to kill multiple people at once rather than a single individual, leading to the development of the character of Jack Welker and the white supremacist gang to be the target of Walter's wrath.

== Reception ==
=== Critical response ===
On review aggregator Rotten Tomatoes, the fifth season has an approval rating of 97% based on 99 reviews, with an average rating of 9.5/10. The site's critics consensus reads: "Breaking Bad's final season cements its status as one of television's great series, propelling its narrative to an explosive conclusion with sharp direction and assured storytelling." On Metacritic, it holds a 99 out of 100 based on 22 reviews, making it the highest-rated season of any show on the site. In his review of the second half of the season, Seth Amitin of IGN stated, "Whether you call it a 'half-season' or consider these final eight episodes its own season, this final batch of Breaking Bad is one of the best runs of episodes TV has ever offered." "Ozymandias" in particular was widely praised and has since been called the greatest television episode ever broadcast.

=== Ratings ===
The fifth season had six separate episodes that became the most watched episodes in the series up to date, in order: "Live Free or Die" (2.93 million), "Say My Name" (2.98), "Blood Money" (5.92), "Ozymandias" (6.37), "Granite State" (6.58), and "Felina" (10.28).

The first half of season five was watched by an average of 2.6 million viewers per episode; the second half averaged 6.04 million viewers. As a whole, season five averaged roughly 4.32 million viewers per episode.

=== Accolades ===
For the 65th Writers Guild of America Awards, the series received four nominations for Best Episodic Drama, for "Buyout" (written by Gennifer Hutchison), "Dead Freight" (George Mastras), "Fifty-One" (Sam Catlin) and "Say My Name" (Thomas Schnauz), and won for Best Dramatic Series. For the 65th Primetime Emmy Awards, the series received 13 nominations, with three wins. It won for Outstanding Drama Series, Anna Gunn won for Outstanding Supporting Actress in a Drama Series, and it won for Outstanding Single-Camera Picture Editing for a Drama Series. Nominations included Bryan Cranston for Outstanding Lead Actor in a Drama Series, Jonathan Banks and Aaron Paul for Outstanding Supporting Actor in a Drama Series, George Mastras and Thomas Schnauz for Outstanding Writing for a Drama Series ("Dead Freight" and "Say My Name"), and Michelle MacLaren for Outstanding Directing for a Drama Series ("Gliding Over All"). For the 29th TCA Awards, Breaking Bad was named Program of the Year, and also was nominated for Outstanding Achievement in Drama, and Individual Achievement in Drama for Bryan Cranston.

For the 66th Writers Guild of America Awards, the series won for Best Dramatic Series and Gennifer Hutchison won for Best Episodic Drama for "Confessions". The series received two other Best Episodic Drama nominations, Thomas Schnauz for "Buried" and Peter Gould for "Granite State". For the 20th Screen Actors Guild Awards, the cast won for Best Drama Ensemble, Bryan Cranston won for Best Drama Actor, Anna Gunn was nominated for Best Drama Actress, and the series was nominated for Best Stunt Team. For the 71st Golden Globe Awards, the series won awards for Best Drama Series and Best Drama Actor (Cranston), while Aaron Paul was nominated for Best Supporting Actor. For the 30th TCA Awards, the series won for Program of the Year and received a nomination for Outstanding Achievement in Drama, and Bryan Cranston was nominated for Individual Achievement in Drama. For the 4th Critics' Choice Television Awards, the series won for Best Drama Series and Aaron Paul won for Best Supporting Actor in a Drama Series. Bryan Cranston received a nomination for Best Actor in a Drama Series and Anna Gunn received a nomination for Best Supporting Actress in a Drama Series. For the 66th Primetime Emmy Awards, the series won Outstanding Drama Series, Bryan Cranston won Outstanding Lead Actor in a Drama Series, Aaron Paul won Outstanding Supporting Actor in a Drama Series, Anna Gunn won Outstanding Supporting Actress in a Drama, Moira Walley-Beckett won Outstanding Writing for a Drama Series for "Ozymandias", and Vince Gilligan was nominated for both Outstanding Writing for a Drama Series and Outstanding Directing for a Drama Series for "Felina".

== Home media ==
=== Part One ===
The first half of the fifth season was released on Blu-ray and DVD as "The Fifth Season" in Region 1 on June 4, 2013.

Special features on the DVD and Blu-ray include:

- "Chicks 'N' Guns" is a scene created and produced exclusively for the home entertainment release.
- Cast & crew commentaries on every episode
- Deleted scenes
- Outtakes

Three all-new featurettes:

- "Nothing Stops This Train" takes viewers on location to see what a huge undertaking it is to film a modern-day train heist.
- "The Cleaner: Jonathan Banks as Mike" gives viewers a chance to spend time with fan-favorite Cleaner, Jonathan Banks, as he talks about his time with the show.
- "Chicks 'N' Guns: Behind-the-Scenes" shows how the scene came to be, going behind the scenes with Aaron Paul and Bob Odenkirk as it's filmed.
- "Writers' Room Timelapse" takes viewers through the entire breaking of episode "Fifty-One" with commentary from the writers.
- Laura Fraser & Jesse Plemons audition footage
- Prison stunt rehearsal footage
- "Gallery 1988 Art Show" features artwork inspired by the show
- "Chris Hardwick's All-Star Celebrity Bowling" features team Breaking Bad going head to head with team Nerdist to raise money for charity.
- Inside Breaking Bad: 19 episodes that give a behind-the-scenes look of what it takes to create an episode
- "Scene by Scene: Directors Discuss Memorable Moments" provides the directors' experience making the show (exclusive to Blu-ray)
- "The Writers of Breaking Bad" gives the writers a turn to show viewers what it's really like to work together and create amazing scripts (exclusive to Blu-ray)

=== Part Two ===
The second half of the fifth season was released on Blu-ray and DVD as "The Final Season" in Region 1 on November 26, 2013.

Special features on the DVD and Blu-ray include:

- Cast and Crew Commentaries on Every Episode
- 4 Featurettes
- The Main Event
- The Final Showdown
- Life of a Show Runner
- Behind-the-Scenes of the Alternate Ending
- Alternate Ending - A 3-minute alternate version of how Breaking Bad could have ended.
- Deleted & Extended Scenes
- Gag Reel
- Walt's Confession
- The Layers of a Sound Mix
- Over 15 Episodes of Inside Breaking Bad
- Uncensored and Extended Episodes
- "Blood Money" Table Read - A rare look at the only final season Breaking Bad table read (Blu-ray exclusive)

== Related media ==
=== Chicks 'N' Guns ===
An eight-minute bonus scene titled Chicks 'N' Guns was included with Breaking Bad's fifth season DVD and Blu-ray sets. Written by Jenn Carroll and Gordon Smith and directed by Michelle MacLaren, the scene offers a backstory on how Jesse Pinkman obtained the gun seen in the episode "Gliding Over All". Sony Pictures released a behind-the-scenes featurette discussing the scene on its YouTube channel.

=== Talking Bad ===
After the success of the live talk show Talking Dead, which aired immediately following new episodes of The Walking Dead, AMC decided to create a similar series, titled Talking Bad, for the remaining episodes of Breaking Bad. Chris Hardwick, host of Talking Dead, also hosted this series; Talking Bad also had a similar logo and theme music to Talking Dead. Talking Bad featured crew members, actors, producers, and television enthusiasts, recapping the most recent episode, and taking questions and comments from viewers.
