= Say My Name (Breaking Bad) =

- Breaking Bad episode
- Walter commands Declan to "say my name", relishing his notoriety gained throughout the series.
- Episode no.: Season 5 Episode 7
- Directed by: Thomas Schnauz
- Written by: Thomas Schnauz
- Cinematography by: Michael Slovis
- Editing by: Skip Macdonald
- Original air date: August 26, 2012
- Running time: 47 minutes

Guest appearances
- Jesse Plemons as Todd Alquist; Steven Michael Quezada as Steven Gomez; Louis Ferreira as Declan; Todd Terry as SAC Ramey; Kaija Roze Bales as Kaylee Ehrmantraut; Chris Freihofer as Dan Wachsberger

Episode chronology
← Previous "Buyout"	Next → "Gliding Over All"
- Breaking Bad season 5

"Say My Name" (originally titled "Everybody Wins") is the seventh episode of the fifth season of the American television crime drama series Breaking Bad, and the 53rd overall episode of the series. Written and directed by Thomas Schnauz, it aired on AMC on August 26, 2012.

The title of the episode is repeated by Walt (Bryan Cranston) during his encounter with Declan (Louis Ferreira).

The episode marks the final series appearance of Jonathan Banks as Mike Ehrmantraut, though he reprised the role in Better Call Saul and El Camino.

== Plot ==
Walter White, Jesse Pinkman, and Mike Ehrmantraut meet with Declan, their Phoenix-based competitor. Instead of agreeing to Declan's offer to purchase the heisted methylamine for $15 million in exchange for removing Walt's blue meth from the drug market, Walt offers a counterproposal: to sell his superior product through Declan's distribution network in exchange for a substantial share of the business and a one-time, $5 million payment to Mike for his share. Declan initially refuses but accepts after realizing Walt is the infamous Heisenberg.

Walt avoids Jesse's attempts to leave with his share of the money. Meanwhile, Mike learns through the bugs that the DEA has a search warrant for his house. He stashes a car with a go bag with cash, a passport, and a gun in an airport parking lot. When Hank and Steve Gomez search his house, they find nothing. Later, Hank instructs Steve to follow Dan Wachsberger, an attorney that Mike uses to deposit the illegal drug cash, catching him in the act.

Jesse confronts Walt and demands his share of the money. Walt cruelly accuses Jesse of having nothing in his life, but his attempts to manipulate Jesse fail, and he ultimately leaves without his money, angering Walt further. Walt is forced to cook his next batch of meth with Todd, who proves to be much more subordinate and better at following orders than Jesse. Pretending to be distraught over Skyler, Walt visits Hank at his office and manages to remove the bugs, but overhears Gomez telling Hank that they have arrested Dan and that he plans on telling everything he knows about Mike. Walt frantically calls Mike, who is at a park with his granddaughter Kaylee, and tells him the DEA is coming for him. Upon the arrival of the police, Mike is forced to flee the park without saying goodbye to Kaylee.

Mike asks Saul Goodman to retrieve the go bag for his getaway, but Saul fears the DEA will follow him. When Jesse volunteers to help, Mike refuses his assistance out of concern that Jesse would be spotted, leaving Walt to retrieve the bag. When Walt meets with Mike, he refuses to hand over the bag unless Mike tells him the names of the nine men he is paying off. Mike takes the bag anyway and a heated argument erupts, in which Mike scolds Walt for his egotistical behavior and accuses him of having ruined their ideal situation working for Gus Fring. Walt storms off, and Mike realizes the revolver in his bag is missing. Walt returns with the revolver and impulsively shoots Mike. Mike tries to get away, but—mortally wounded—ultimately resigns himself to sitting on a log by the river. After Walt catches up to him, he realizes he could have just asked Lydia Rodarte-Quayle for the names, and that shooting Mike was unnecessary. Walt attempts to apologize; Mike tells him to "Shut the fuck up, and let me die in peace", and succumbs to his wound a few seconds later.

== Production ==
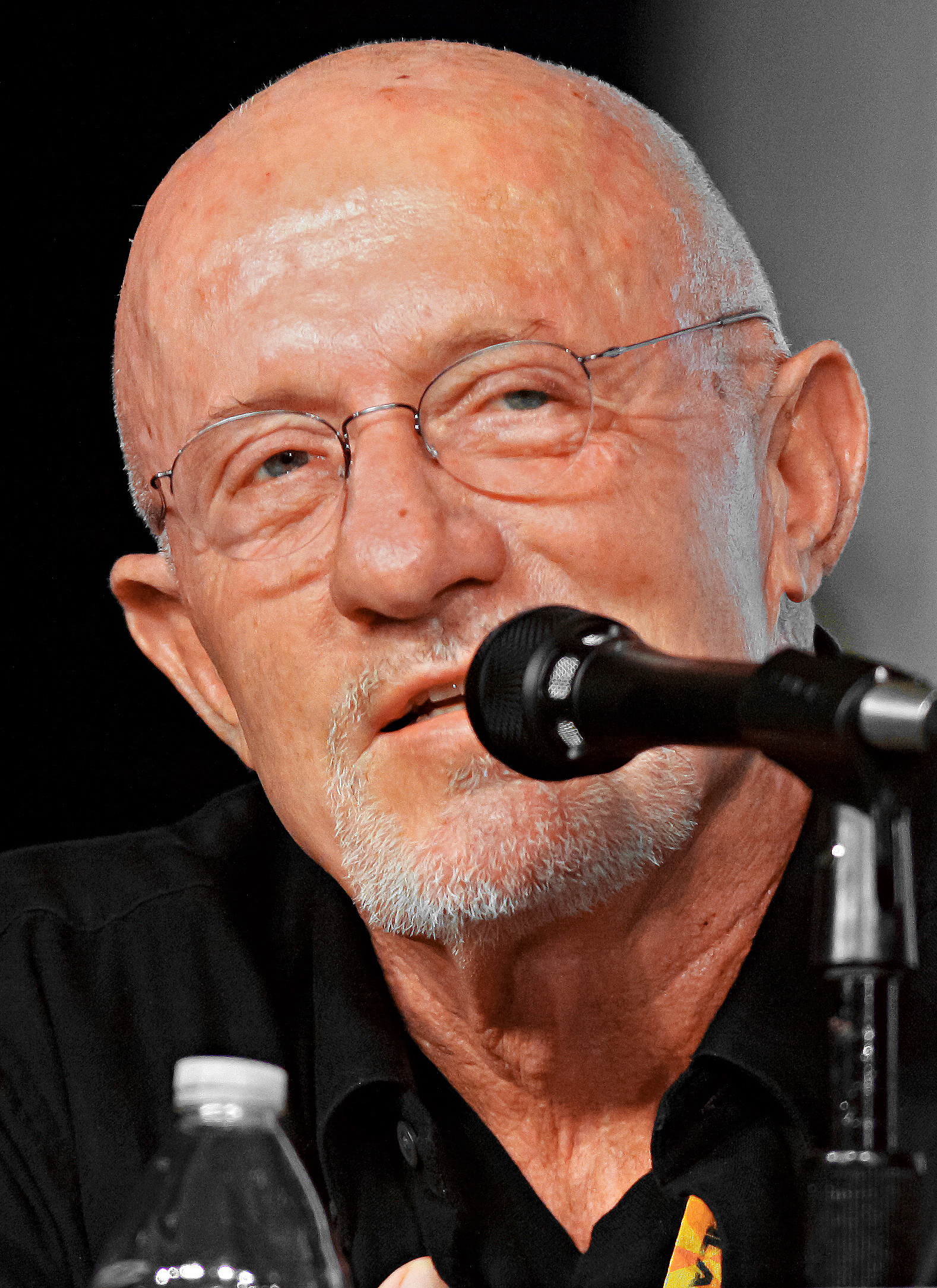
Banks made his final appearance as a series regular in "Say My Name"

The episode was written and directed by Thomas Schnauz and aired on AMC on August 26, 2012.

This episode marks the final Breaking Bad appearance of Mike Ehrmantraut (Jonathan Banks) as a series regular. Show creator Vince Gilligan talked about Mike's death and why it was one of his favorite moments of the series:

In season 5A, as we call it, the character of Mike gets brought down by Walt in a moment that Walt himself I don't think sees coming, and it's just a sad moment, beautifully written and directed by one of my oldest friends, a writer named Thomas Schnauz, who I've known since NYU film school, and in his first professional directing gig he just did a fantastic job with that episode and that scene.

Banks said Mike's death did not surprise him because he always believed the character would die at some point. Banks reprised his role as Mike Ehrmantraut in Better Call Saul and El Camino.

== Reception ==
=== Ratings ===
"Say My Name" was watched by 2.98 million viewers and received a 1.4 rating among viewers aged 18–49, the series' highest ratings and viewers at the time.

=== Critical reception ===
TV Fanatic's Matt Richenthal gave "Say My Name" a five-star rating, calling it "one of the best in series history." Seth Amitin of IGN gave the episode a 9 out of 10 rating, calling it "mind-blowing", but stating that "I hate to see Mike go out like that. He deserved more. I literally can't give this higher than a 9.0, it was just too sad of an ending." Alan Sepinwall of HitFix thought the episode was "a mostly tremendous episode of a drama", adding the death of Mike "is just a gorgeous, devastating scene", but he was unimpressed by the plotting that led to Mike showing any trust for Walt in that situation, writing that it was a contrived way to ensure that Walt would be in a position to kill Mike per the requirements of the overall show story.

Thomas Schnauz was nominated for the Primetime Emmy Award for Outstanding Writing for a Drama Series for writing this episode.

In 2019, The Ringer ranked "Say My Name" as the 8th best out of the 62 total Breaking Bad episodes.
