= Live Free or Die (Breaking Bad) =

- Breaking Bad episode
- Episode no.: Season 5 Episode 1
- Directed by: Michael Slovis
- Written by: Vince Gilligan
- Cinematography by: Marshall Adams
- Editing by: Skip Macdonald
- Running time: 43 minutes

Guest appearances
- Christopher Cousins as Ted Beneke; Steven Michael Quezada as Steven Gomez; Jim Beaver as Lawson; Larry Hankin as Old Joe; JB Blanc as Barry Goodman

Episode chronology
← Previous "Face Off"	Next → "Madrigal"
- Breaking Bad season 5

"Live Free or Die" is the fifth season premiere episode of the American television drama series Breaking Bad, the first episode of the first part of the season and the 47th overall episode of the series. Written by series creator Vince Gilligan and directed by Michael Slovis, it originally aired on AMC in the United States on July 15, 2012.

The episode is titled after the official motto of the U.S. state of New Hampshire, seen on a license plate in the opening.

== Plot ==
The episode starts with a flashforward to a disheveled Walter White celebrating his 52nd birthday alone in an Albuquerque Denny's, using a false name and posing as a New Hampshirite. (Note: Foreshadowing the events of “Granite State” and "Felina".) He illegally purchases an M60 machine gun from Lawson which is hidden inside the trunk of a car.

In the present, Walt disposes of any evidence connecting him to Gus Fring's killing and Brock Cantillo's poisoning. Skyler White tries not to speak to Walt, explaining that she is now scared of him. Walt suddenly remembers the surveillance cameras that Gus installed in the superlab, and realizes that the footage Gus may have collected could incriminate him.

The following day, Mike Ehrmantraut, who is still recovering from injuries sustained in the shootout, (Note: As depicted in "Salud".) learns of Gus's death and furiously drives back to New Mexico. He comes across Walt and Jesse Pinkman and is prepared to kill Walt, but Walt and Jesse convince him that Gus's laptop, which has been seized by police as evidence, needs to be dealt with.

Mike advises that they all leave the city, as the police will inevitably find them in the lab camera footage. Mike and Walt argue over the best option to take until Jesse suggests that they could use a magnet to destroy the laptop and any evidence of their crimes. Together, Jesse and Walt concoct a plan to use an industrial electromagnet (acquired from Joe at the junkyard) to destroy the laptop from outside the police building. They pull it off, despite being forced to abandon the truck. As they drive away, Walt defies Mike's doubts that everything is settled.

Meanwhile, Saul Goodman approaches Skyler at the car wash and tells her that Ted Beneke survived the injury from his encounter with Kuby and Huell. Skyler visits Ted in the hospital and finds that he has been fitted with a halo brace. An intimidated Ted tells her that he will remain silent about what caused his injury. Elsewhere, Walt argues with Saul about the lawyer's failure to inform him about Skyler's bailout to Ted. It is revealed that Huell was told to pickpocket Jesse's ricin cigarette, which is why Jesse believed it was lost; Saul presents the cigarette to Walt in a plastic bag, remarking that he had no idea Walt was going to poison Brock in the service of killing Gus. Saul tries to end his and Walt's business relationship, but Walt threateningly tells him, "We're done when I say we're done".

The episode ends with Walter hugging Skyler, and forgiving her for bailing out Ted.

== Production ==
In July 2011, series creator Vince Gilligan indicated that he intended to conclude Breaking Bad with the fifth season. In early August 2011, negotiations began over a deal regarding the fifth and possible final season between the network AMC and Sony Pictures Television, the series' production company. AMC proposed a shortened fifth season (six to eight episodes, instead of 13) to cut costs, but the producers declined. Sony then approached other cable networks about possibly picking up the show if a deal could not be made. On August 14, 2011, AMC and Breaking Bad's production team agreed to renew the series for a final 16 episodes. Filming began for the season on March 26, 2012.

Following a dispute between AMC and Dish Network that led to Dish's dropping AMC as of July 1, 2012, AMC posted the episode online for streaming. The episode is the shortest in the series, with a runtime of approximately 43 minutes.

== Reception ==
=== Ratings ===
"Live Free or Die" was the most watched episode in Breaking Bad's history at the time, with 2.93 million viewers.

=== Reviews ===
Brent Koepp of Paste rated the episode a 9.4/10 stating that, "It's suspenseful and humorous, but there is a lingering sense of doom hanging over it." Donna Bowman of The A.V. Club gave the episode an A−. Seth Amitin of IGN gave the episode a 8.5/10 commenting that, "Hopefully we get a few episodes that aren't quite as intense mixed in, just so it drives up the ending tension even more."

In 2019, The Ringer ranked "Live Free or Die" as the 23rd best out of the 62 total Breaking Bad episodes.
