= Dead Freight =

- Breaking Bad episode
- Todd points his gun at the young boy.
- Episode no.: Season 5 Episode 5
- Directed by: George Mastras
- Written by: George Mastras
- Cinematography by: Michael Slovis
- Editing by: Skip Macdonald
- Original air date: August 12, 2012
- Running time: 48 minutes

Guest appearances
- Laura Fraser as Lydia Rodarte-Quayle; Jesse Plemons as Todd Alquist; Steven Michael Quezada as Steven Gomez; Bill Burr as Patrick Kuby; Jamie McShane as the train conductor; Myk Watford as the train engineer; Ryan Begay as the Good Samaritan; Samuel Webb as Drew Sharp

Episode chronology
← Previous "Fifty-One"	Next → "Buyout"
- Breaking Bad season 5

"Dead Freight" is the fifth episode of the fifth season of the American television drama series Breaking Bad, and the 51st overall episode of the series. Written and directed by George Mastras, it originally aired on AMC in the United States on August 12, 2012.

== Plot ==
A young boy is seen riding on his dirt bike through the desert. Encountering a wild tarantula, he allows it to crawl over his hands before placing it in a jar. He hears a distant freight train and rides toward it.

Walter White pays a visit to the recently promoted Hank Schrader at his new DEA office. During their conversation, Walt confesses that his marriage to Skyler White is failing, feigning tears. When Hank leaves momentarily to get coffee, Walt installs covert listening devices on the computer and inside a picture frame sitting on top of Hank's desk. Later, Walt, Jesse Pinkman, and Mike Ehrmantraut interrogate Lydia Rodarte-Quayle about the tracking device found affixed to the bottom of one of Madrigal's methylamine barrels. Mike and Walt believe that she planted it and decide to kill her, but Jesse does not. After forcing Lydia to contact Hank and report her discovery, the crew eavesdrops on Hank's next phone call, learning that it was actually placed by a DEA team in Houston.

Although exonerated, Lydia is now useless to the trio, as all of the barrels in her warehouse are compromised. Desperate to avoid being killed, Lydia tries to prove her worth by asserting that she can access an "ocean" of methylamine, suggesting that the trio could heist a tremendous amount of methylamine from a transiting train. At first, the trio is skeptical, but with Jesse's motivation, they come up with a plan to stall the train in a stretch of dark territory, pump out the methylamine, and replace its weight with water, so that no one will know that the heist took place. Jesse informs Todd Alquist that neither he nor his crew can ever say anything to anyone about the heist, and that no one must find out about the heist under any circumstances.

Meanwhile, Walter White Jr. returns to the White home, insisting that he will not leave until Walt and Skyler tell him what is happening between them. Walt orders Walt Jr. to return to Hank and Marie Schrader's home. Skyler informs Walt that she has decided to keep his secrets and continue laundering his money so long as their children remain away from them. Walt assures her that there is no danger to them, though Skyler has made up her mind, believing that one day, someone will arrive at their home with the intent of harming them. Walt agrees to keep the children away from their home.

On the day of the heist, Walt's crew manages to stop the train by blocking a railroad crossing with a "broken-down" dump truck driven by Patrick Kuby. When the engineer and conductor exit the locomotive to assist him, Mike acts as a lookout while Walt, Jesse, and Todd drain methylamine from the train into an empty buried tank, simultaneously pumping water back in to ensure its weight remains unchanged. The robbery is threatened when a good samaritan arrives on the scene and pushes the dump truck off the tracks earlier than expected. Mike pleads for Walt to call off the job, but Walt insists that they push on, and they narrowly manage to succeed. As Walt, Jesse, and Todd celebrate their success, they turn to see the young boy stopped on his dirt bike behind them. He waves at the trio, and Todd waves back before drawing a handgun and shooting and killing him, to Jesse's horror.

== Production ==
"Dead Freight" was written and directed by George Mastras, making his directorial debut on the series. Mastras revealed that the episode was logistically complicated to film because many cameras were needed to capture the lengthy train heist sequence. On the first day of filming the sequence, the train broke down. According to Vince Gilligan, the sequence took four days to shoot.

The episode was originally titled "Dark Territory," but was changed to avoid confusion with the film Under Siege 2: Dark Territory. Coincidentally, that film also features actor Jonathan Banks. Mastras explains that "dead freight" refers to wasted space on a vessel that has been paid for in full.

== Reception ==
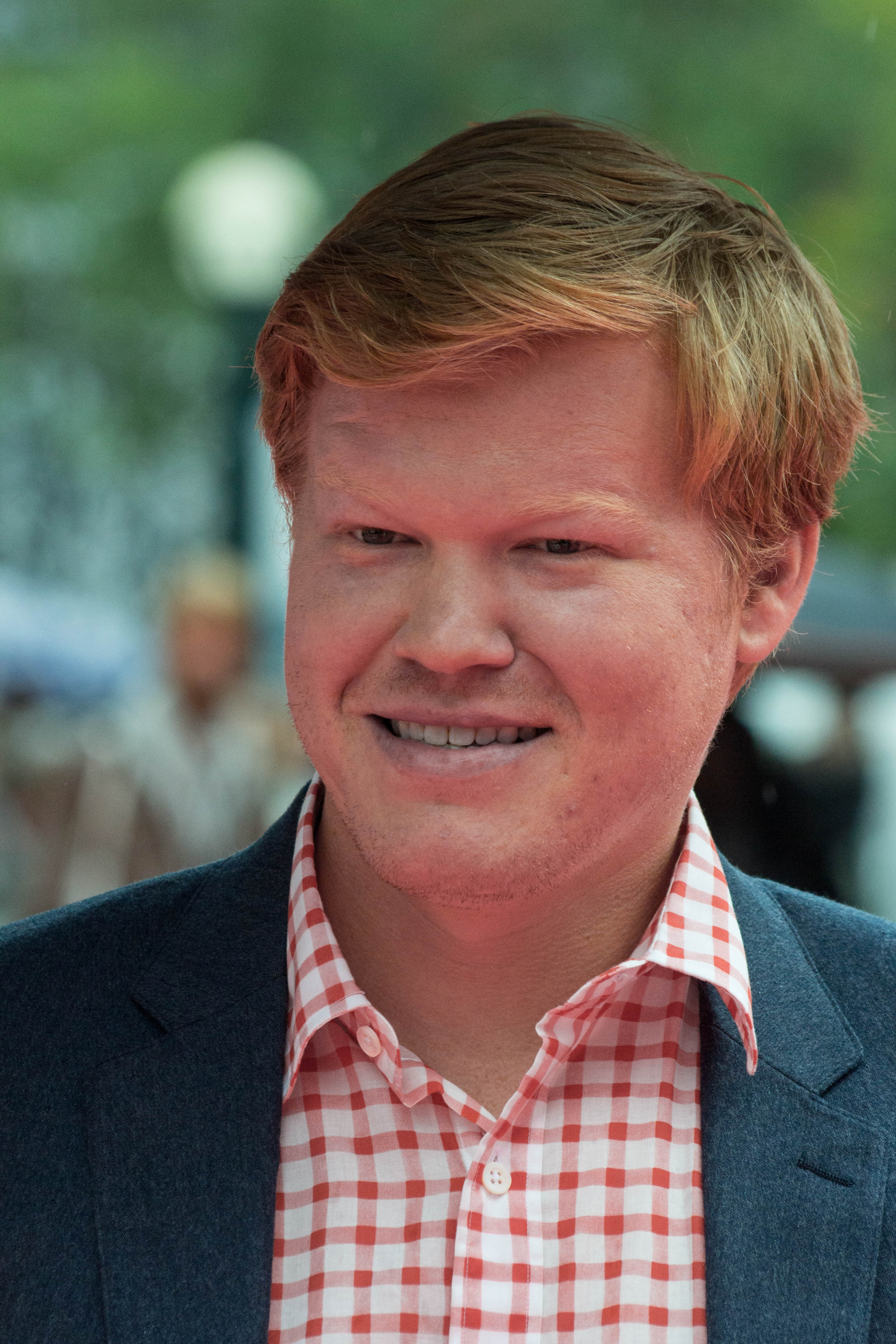
Critics praised the character development of Todd, played by Jesse Plemons

=== Ratings ===
"Dead Freight" was watched by 2.48 million viewers and received a 1.3 rating among viewers aged 18–49.

=== Critical reception ===
Donna Bowman of The A.V. Club rated it as an A−. Though she criticized the material with Skyler and Walt Jr., calling it "clumsily functional", she stated that "this weak patch is more than made up for by the tremendous extended heist sequence and its tragic culmination, which is both well-conceived and perfectly shot." Seth Amitin of IGN rated the episode with a 10 out of 10, calling it "beautifully crafted" and "excellently executed". Alan Sepinwall of HitFix called "Dead Freight" a "great episode", stating: "So much fun, and then such a devastating but not unfair gut punch at the end." Sean T. Collins of Rolling Stone called the episode "harrowing, heartbreaking, magnificent television".

This episode was nominated for four Primetime Emmy Awards, George Mastras was nominated for the Primetime Emmy Award for Outstanding Writing for a Drama Series for writing this episode, Skip Macdonald was nominated for Outstanding Single-Camera Picture Editing for a Drama Series, Darryl L. Frank, Jeffrey Perkins, and Eric Justen were nominated for Outstanding Sound Mixing for a Comedy or Drama Series (One-Hour), and Kurt Nicholas Forshager, Kathryn Madsen, Jane Boegel, Mark Cookson, Cormac Funge, Jason Tregoe Newman, Jeffrey Cranford, Gregg Barbanell, and Dominique Decaudain were nominated Outstanding Sound Editing for a Comedy or Drama Series (One-Hour).

TV Guide's 65 Best Episodes of the 21st Century listed "Dead Freight" as just outside the top 10, but was mentioned as three alternate choices for that distinction.

In 2019, The Ringer ranked "Dead Freight" as the 18th best out of the 62 total Breaking Bad episodes.
