= Granite State (Breaking Bad) =

- Breaking Bad episode
- Walt grieves after being wished dead by his son.
- Episode no.: Season 5 Episode 15
- Directed by: Peter Gould
- Written by: Peter Gould
- Cinematography by: Michael Slovis
- Editing by: Kelley Dixon; Chris McCaleb
- Original air date: September 22, 2013
- Running time: 53 minutes

Guest appearances
- Emily Rios as Andrea Cantillo; Michael Bowen as Jack Welker; Kevin Rankin as Kenny; Adam Godley as Elliott Schwartz; Jessica Hecht as Gretchen Schwartz; Carmen Serano as Carmen Molina; Brennan Brown as the US Attorney; Eric Price as Skyler's lawyer; Todd Terry as SAC Ramey; Charlie Rose as himself; Robert Forster as Ed Galbraith

Episode chronology
← Previous "Ozymandias"	Next → "Felina"
- Breaking Bad season 5

"Granite State" is the fifteenth and the penultimate episode of the fifth season of the American television crime drama series Breaking Bad. Written and directed by executive producer Peter Gould, it aired on AMC in the United States and Canada on September 22, 2013. The episode's plot serves as a continuation of the previous episode, "Ozymandias", and mainly follows Walter White (Bryan Cranston) as he evades arrest by fleeing to New Hampshire.

The episode was the second one that Gould directed after "Problem Dog" in the show's fourth season. While writing the episode, the team was troubled on how to continue the story of the series, primarily the character progression of Walt. They ultimately decided to have Walt slowly become depressed throughout the course of the episode. "Granite State" also marked the final appearance of character Saul Goodman (Bob Odenkirk), until the premiere of Better Call Saul in 2015.

"Granite State" received positive reviews from critics, who mainly focused on the storytelling and the phone-call scene between Walter White and his son. It was watched by over 6.4 million viewers, setting a new record for the show. It was nominated for several awards, with Robert Forster's guest performance earning him the Saturn Award for Best Guest Starring Role on Television.

== Plot ==
Saul Goodman and Walter White wait at Ed Galbraith's shop while Ed obtains them new identities. (Note: As seen in "Ozymandias") Wanting revenge on Jack Welker, Walt attempts to coerce Saul into coming with him but is subdued by a coughing fit. No longer intimidated, Saul leaves for his new life in Omaha, Nebraska.

Jack's gang raids Marie Schrader's house and finds Jesse Pinkman's confession tape. (Note: As seen in "Rabid Dog") While Jack wants to kill Jesse for informing, Todd Alquist wants Jesse to cook meth so Todd can impress Lydia Rodarte-Quayle, with whom he has become infatuated. Knowing Skyler once met Lydia, (Note: As seen in "Blood Money") Todd and other gang members break into her house and threaten her to keep quiet. Lydia is not convinced Skyler will stay silent, and aims to end their meth operation, but reconsiders after Todd informs her the meth the gang produces is now at 92% purity because of Jesse. Jesse tries to escape, but is recaptured and forced to watch Todd murder Andrea Cantillo. Jack threatens to murder Andrea's son Brock if Jesse attempts another escape.

Ed takes Walt to a secluded cabin in New Hampshire and says he will visit monthly to bring food and supplies. He cautions that Walt risks capture if he leaves the cabin. Months later, a disheveled, lonely Walt has a long beard and full head of hair. Ed tells Walt that Skyler is using her maiden name and working part-time as a taxi dispatcher. As the nationwide manhunt for Walt continues, his abandoned house has become a tourist attraction.

Walt packs $100,000 into a box and walks into town. He stops at the local bar and pays a barmaid to call Walter White Jr.'s school pretending to be Marie. Walt tries reconciling with Walter Jr., who has reverted to using the name Flynn, and says he will mail money to Flynn's friend Louis for Flynn to give Skyler. Continuing to blame him for Hank Schrader's death, an enraged Flynn wishes Walt dead and ends the call. A dejected Walt calls the DEA to surrender, leaving the phone off the hook so they can trace his location. While waiting, Walt sees television host Charlie Rose interviewing Gretchen and Elliott Schwartz, who trivialize his involvement with Gray Matter Technologies. Now roused to anger, Walt flees before the police arrive.

== Production ==
"Granite State" aired on AMC in the United States and Canada on September 22, 2013. It was written and directed by executive producer Peter Gould. It was the second episode that Gould directed, after "Problem Dog", an episode of the fourth season. The episode title refers to the nickname of New Hampshire, which is where Walt is relocated upon being given a new identity.

The writing team faced difficulties during the production of "Granite State", primarily on how to continue the character progression of Walter White. After the death of character Hank Schrader in the previous episode, the team was unsure whether Walt would become depressed, or if he would have a different reaction. They ultimately decided that the episode would be the former, with Gould describing it as Walt "hitting bottom". The episode's reposing tone was an intentional contrast from the previous episode, "Ozymandias". An example of a scene that demonstrated this was where Walt attempts to "conjure up the spirit of Heisenberg" by attempting to intimidate Saul and formulate a plan on how to succeed, but Saul instead simply tells him that "it's over".

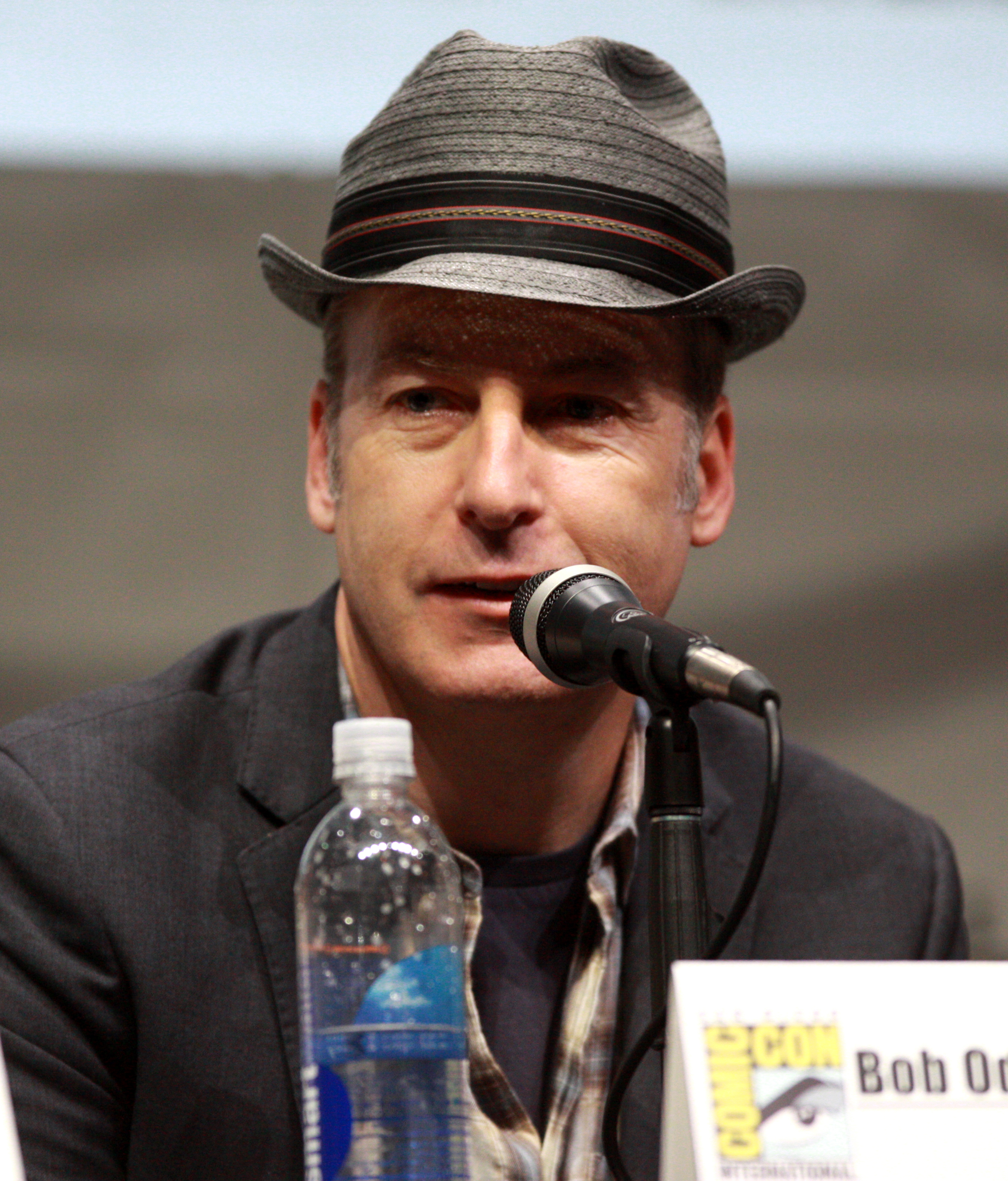
Bob Odenkirk made his final (pre-Better Call Saul) appearance as Saul Goodman in "Granite State"

The portions of the episode in New Hampshire were filmed on Sandia Crest. During filming, parts of the phone call between Walt and his son needed to be redone after an airplane ran over the film. The episode, alongside the following episode "Felina", were given extended run-times compared to the rest of the series.

"Granite State" marked the final appearance of Saul Goodman (played by Bob Odenkirk) as he flees to Nebraska. Odenkirk returned as Saul in Better Call Saul, the spin-off prequel to Breaking Bad. In "Granite State", Saul tells Walt, "if I'm lucky, a month from now, best-case scenario, I'm managing a Cinnabon in Omaha." Gould said this was simply a throwaway line as Better Call Saul had not yet been conceptualized, but once that series was greenlit, it was decided to show in the flash-forward of the series premiere that Saul had indeed become a Cinnabon manager in Omaha, Nebraska. Scenes that take place during the events of "Granite State" are featured in the Better Call Saul episodes "Quite a Ride", "Wine and Roses", and "Saul Gone".

== Reception ==
"Granite State" was generally well received by critics. It was watched by nearly 6.6 million viewers on its original broadcast, which was an increase from the 6.4 million viewers of "Ozymandias", and a record high for the series. It is the seventh highest rated episode of Breaking Bad on IMDb, with an average rating of 9.7 out of 10 among viewers.

Several critics praised the story and writing of "Granite State". Reviewers generally praised the episode for its role as a precursor to the series finale, "Felina", and many initial reviewers became more anticipated for that episode due to "Granite State". Slant's Chuck Bowen wrote that episode "coolly navigates a rich variety of tones" as it showcased Walt's "final oblivion". He also said that the episode allowed viewers to process how mentally drained Walt had become over the course of the show. Seth Amitin of IGN and June Thomas of Slate felt similarly to Bowen, with Thomas believing that if there was any takeaway from the episode's plot, it was that "things can always get worse". Allison Keene of Collider was indifferent, and further believed that the episode did a "great job" of showcasing Walt's desperation and loneliness after a long time away from human contact.

In their rankings of every Breaking Bad episode, The Ringer ranked "Granite State" as the seventh best episode of the series. An editor of the site, Chris Ryan, wrote that the episode was "epic in scope" and had a "season's worth of plot" whilst also not feeling "too tidy or rushed". He further described the episode's plot as "full of terror and tenderness" in reference to the last appearance of Saul, and that the episode could have been a "fitting ending" for the series on its own. Another ranking of every Breaking Bad episode by Vulture placed "Granite State" as the twenty-seventh best episode of the series.

=== Analysis ===
During the phone call between Walt and Flynn, where Walt attempts to give him the money in a final act of desperation, Flynn yells "why don't you just die?" to his father, which were the same words spoken by Flynn during season 1 when Walt was first diagnosed with cancer. Comparing both uses of the line, Laura Hudson of Wired described the usage in season 1 to be the "angry, wounded talk" of a teenager grieving at the thought of losing his father, and its usage in "Granite State" to be Flynn quite literally wishing for his father's death after the damage he had done to the family. Tim Goodman of The Hollywood Reporter compared Walt's voice on the phone to "an animal's dying desperation", and Flynn's voice to be "rage and anger of the wronged".

After his son berates him over the phone, Walt cries "it can't all have been for nothing", which Goodman further described as what the story of Breaking Bad effectively was, and that it was, in fact, all for nothing. Hudson echoed similar thoughts, furthermore describing the episode as the embodiment of what Saul telling Walt "it's over" in the opening of the episode. Amitin believed that the episode's predominant usage of the color white showcased a visual metaphor within the series, with earlier episodes being noticeably more colorful than "Granite State"; he believed that this represented a "new start or a blank slate for a new ending".

=== Accolades ===
This episode was nominated for two Creative Arts Emmy Awards. Michael Slovis was nominated for Outstanding Cinematography for a Single-Camera Series (One Hour), while Kelley Dixon and Chris McCaleb were nominated for Outstanding Single-Camera Picture Editing for a Drama Series, losing to Skip Macdonald for the following episode "Felina". Peter Gould was nominated for the Writers Guild of America Award for Television: Episodic Drama for writing "Granite State", while Robert Forster's guest performance earned him the Saturn Award for Best Guest Starring Role on Television.
