= Buried (Breaking Bad) =

- Breaking Bad episode
- Episode no.: Season 5 Episode 10
- Directed by: Michelle MacLaren
- Written by: Thomas Schnauz
- Cinematography by: Arthur Albert
- Editing by: Skip Macdonald; Sharidan Williams-Sotelo
- Original air date: August 18, 2013
- Running time: 47 minutes

Guest appearances
- Steven Michael Quezada as Steven Gomez; Bill Burr as Patrick Kuby; Lavell Crawford as Huell Babineaux; Louis Ferreira as Declan; Michael Bowen as Jack Welker; Kevin Rankin as Kenny; Gonzalo Menendez as Detective Kalanchoe; Jason Douglas as Detective Munn

Episode chronology
← Previous "Blood Money"	Next → "Confessions"
- Breaking Bad season 5

"Buried" is the tenth episode of the fifth season of the American television drama series Breaking Bad, and the 56th overall episode of the series. Written by Thomas Schnauz and directed by Michelle MacLaren, it aired on AMC in the United States and Canada on August 18, 2013.

== Plot ==
Late at night, an elderly man, collecting the money which Jesse Pinkman has thrown away, (Note: As depicted in "Blood Money".) discovers him parked in a playground and absentmindedly spinning on a merry-go-round. Meanwhile, after his confrontation with Hank Schrader, Walter White frantically tries calling Skyler White, but cannot get through as Hank is already on the phone with her. Walt rushes to the car wash, but Skyler has already left to meet Hank at a diner. Though understanding Skyler to be a victim, Hank unwittingly reveals that Walt's cancer has returned and unsuccessfully tries enlisting her help in building a case against Walt. Skyler, however, suspects that Hank has made it a personal mission to convict Walt and worries that Hank may not truly have her best interests at heart. She then panics and leaves the diner.

Walt goes to Saul Goodman's office, angered that Skyler went to Hank before talking to him. When Saul asks whether Walt has considered killing Hank, which he refers to as "sending him to Belize like Mike", Walt admonishes him, saying that Hank is family. Rushing to hide his money, Walt has Patrick Kuby and Huell Babineaux deliver it to him in seven container drums. He then drives to the Tohajiilee Indian Reservation and spends the day burying it. Meanwhile, Marie Schrader confronts Skyler about Walt's criminality. After learning that Skyler knew about Walt's activities before Hank was shot, Marie slaps her, despite a tearful Skyler's attempts to apologize. Marie tries to leave with Walt and Skyler's infant daughter Holly, but Hank enters the house and tells Marie to give Holly back. In the car, Marie tells Hank that he "has to get" Walt.

Walt returns home late and posts a lottery ticket on the refrigerator door; its numbers correspond to the GPS coordinates of the buried drums. Unresponsive to Skyler's questioning, an exhausted Walt collapses. When he awakens, Walt offers to surrender himself on the condition that the money be kept for their children. Instead, Skyler tells Walt that they should keep quiet, noting that Hank has no evidence. Elsewhere, Lydia Rodarte-Quayle confronts Declan, now cooking and supplying meth, at his desert lab. She is critical of the poor standards and working conditions, but Declan rejects her suggestion to hire Todd, Walt's former protégé. At Lydia's behest, Todd and his uncle Jack arrive and massacre Declan and his men before taking over the operation.

Hank will not approach the Drug Enforcement Administration until he has reliable evidence to apprehend Walt, as he knows his career will be over once it emerges that Heisenberg is actually his brother-in-law and wants to at least have the satisfaction of being the one to take him down. Marie insists on putting the DEA on the case, concerned over how they may respond if they learn that Hank hid his discovery. Hank agrees and returns to work, but before he can reveal his findings to his superiors, Agent Steve Gomez reveals that Jesse is detained and under questioning. Hank, realizing Jesse's connection to Walt and seeing an opportunity to get some hard evidence, decides to keep quiet for a while and asks for time alone with Jesse.

== Production ==
Walt's burial scene is on Navajo land, the same spot where Walt and Jesse cooked their first batch in the RV. The latitude and longitude displayed on Walt's GPS receiver and on the lottery ticket are in fact the coordinates of the Albuquerque Studios location where Breaking Bad is filmed.

=== Dedication ===
The episode is dedicated to Thomas Schnauz Sr., father of the writer of this episode.

== Music ==
The song played over Walt's digging is Chancha Vía Circuito's remix of Argentine José Larralde's "Quimey Neuquén".

== Reception ==
=== Viewership ===
The episode was watched by 4.77 million people on its original broadcast, down from the series-high 5.92 million of the previous episode.

=== Reviews ===
TVLine gave Anna Gunn an honorable mention in their "Performer of the Week" feature for her performance in this episode.

In 2019 The Ringer ranked "Buried" 52nd out of the 62 total Breaking Bad episodes.

=== Accolades ===
Thomas Schnauz was nominated for the Writers Guild of America Award for Television: Episodic Drama for this episode.
