= Fifty-One =

- Breaking Bad episode
- Episode no.: Season 5 Episode 4
- Directed by: Rian Johnson
- Written by: Sam Catlin
- Cinematography by: Michael Slovis
- Editing by: Kelley Dixon
- Original air date: August 5, 2012
- Running time: 47 minutes

Guest appearances
- Laura Fraser as Lydia Rodarte-Quayle; Steven Michael Quezada as Steven Gomez; Todd Terry as SAC Ramey; Russ Dillen as Ron Forenall

Episode chronology
← Previous "Hazard Pay"	Next → "Dead Freight"
- Breaking Bad season 5

"Fifty-One" is the fourth episode of the fifth season of the American television crime drama series Breaking Bad, and the 50th overall episode of the series. Written by Sam Catlin and directed by Rian Johnson, it originally aired on AMC in the United States on August 5, 2012.

== Plot ==
After having it repaired, Walter White impulsively sells his Pontiac Aztek to the mechanic for $50 and leases himself a new Chrysler 300 and a Dodge Challenger for Walter White Jr.

At Madrigal's Houston branch, Lydia Rodarte-Quayle's inside man for methylamine is arrested by the DEA. Mike reassures Lydia that Ron will not talk, adding that she will have a new guy in the warehouse soon.

The next day, SAC Ramey offers Hank Schrader the position of ASAC (Assistant Special Agent in Charge) vacated by Merkert. Hank accepts, even though his pursuit of Heisenberg will be given to a field agent.

That evening, the Whites and the Schraders finish a meager 51st birthday dinner for Walt. After Walt Jr. leaves, Walt notes that it has been a year since his cancer diagnosis. As he reflects, a fully clothed Skyler White steps into the pool and slowly submerges herself. Marie Schrader panics while Walt jumps in to pull her out. Walt then learns that Skyler has asked Marie and Hank to look after the kids until her issues with Walt are resolved. Skyler insists that she will not have her children living in a house where dangerous events that occur are just shrugged off. She threatens to further harm herself if Walt brings the kids back home, but he belittles her plans as unworkable, even threatening to have her institutionalized. Breaking down and realizing there is no way out of her situation without hurting her family, she relents to his arguments but not without admitting to him that her only option is to hope that Walt's cancer will come back and kill him.

At the warehouse in Houston, Lydia leads Jesse Pinkman to a barrel of methylamine. They find a GPS tracker on the bottom of the barrel, compromising it. Mike is skeptical that the tracker was planted by the DEA because of its crude placement on the bottom of the barrel. When informed by Jesse that it was Lydia who spotted it first, Mike concludes that Lydia planted it herself in order to get out of their deal and vows to kill her. Jesse pleads for Mike to show mercy and asks for Walt's opinion. Walt votes to keep her alive so no time is lost finding a new precursor supplier. Jesse later gives Walt a TAG Heuer Monaco Calibre 12 wristwatch as a birthday present, which pleases Walt. Later that night, he shows Skyler the watch, assuring her that if Jesse could change his mind about wanting Walt dead, so will she.

== Production ==
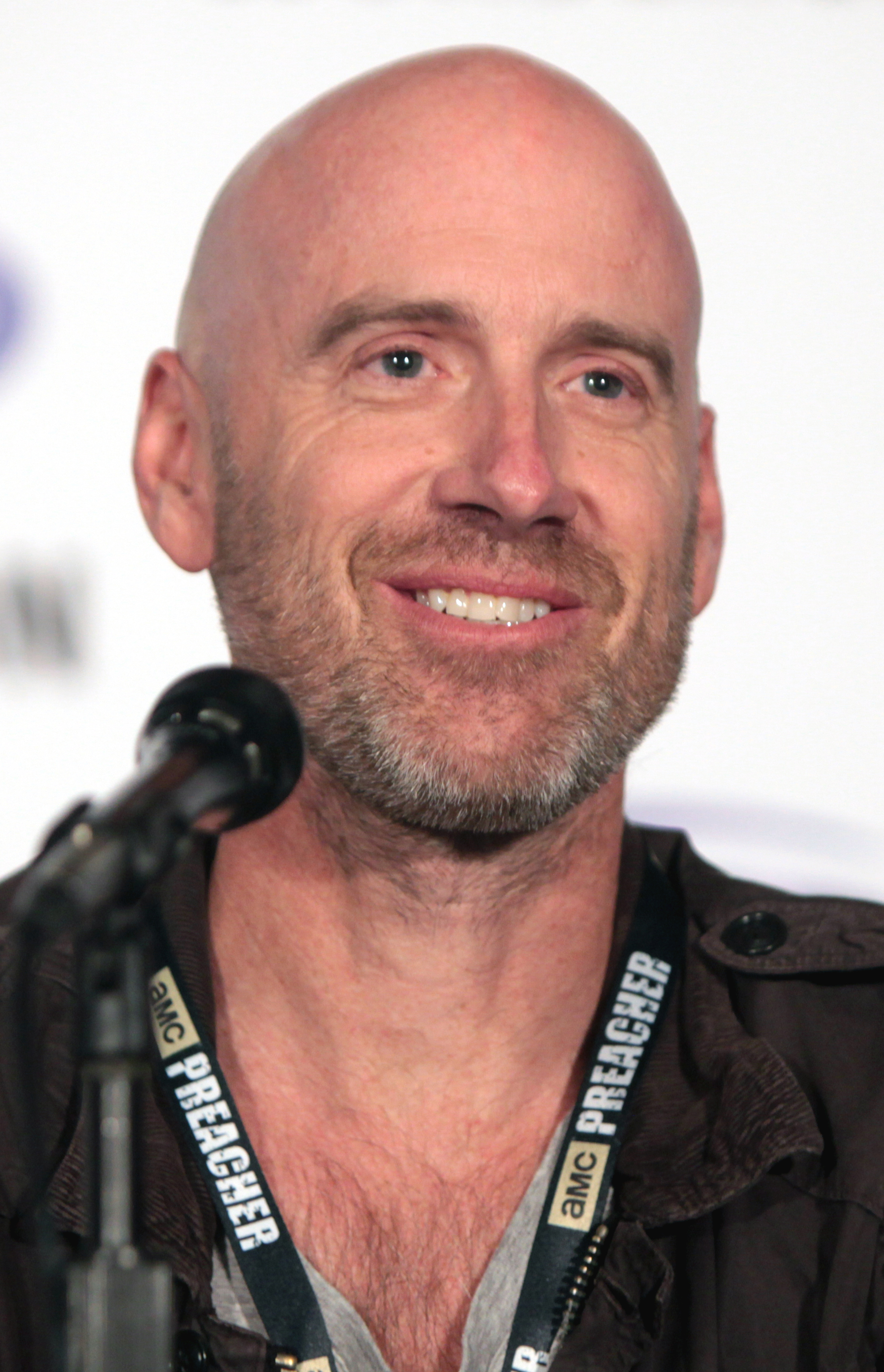
Sam Catlin wrote the episode.

Dean Norris (Hank Schrader) spoke about the "tense" family dinner scene: "Those are some of my favorites because we all get together, and they've kind of become a signature thing on the show. I work with the DEA guys all the time, who I love, but from a personal side it's nice to hang out with the rest of the gang. Those scenes are going to be even more interesting if Hank ever knows something about Walt that Walt doesn't know he knows, because for the entire series Walt's had this secret that everybody in the audience knows and Hank is the one guy that doesn't know it."

== Reception ==
=== Ratings ===
"Fifty-One" was watched by approximately 2.29 million American viewers in its original broadcast, matching the second episode's numbers.

=== Critical reception ===
The Baltimore Sun's Wesley Case called Skyler's pool scene "unnerving" and "heart-wrenchingly sad", adding "Breaking Bad is a show built around action — big explosions, shoot-outs, throat-cutting murders, and other vivid portraits of the messy drug-dealing business. Besides Jesse's breakdowns, we rarely see the existential crises all of these characters must be dealing with at all times."

In 2019, The Ringer ranked "Fifty-One" as the 30th best out of the 62 total Breaking Bad episodes.

=== Awards and nominations ===
For his direction of this episode, Rian Johnson won the Directors Guild of America Award for Outstanding Directing – Drama Series. Anna Gunn won the Primetime Emmy Award for Outstanding Supporting Actress in a Drama Series for her performance in this episode at the 65th Primetime Emmy Awards.
