= Madrigal (Breaking Bad) =

- Breaking Bad episode
- Episode no.: Season 5 Episode 2
- Directed by: Michelle MacLaren
- Written by: Vince Gilligan
- Cinematography by: Michael Slovis
- Editing by: Kelley Dixon
- Original air date: July 22, 2012
- Running time: 47 minutes

Guest appearances
- Laura Fraser as Lydia Rodarte-Quayle; Steven Michael Quezada as Steven Gomez; Michael Shamus Wiles as George Merkert; Norbert Weisser as Peter Schuler; Wolf Muser as Herr Herzog; Carrington Vilmont as the chief food technician; James Ning as Duane Chow; Kaija Roze Bales as Kaylee Ehrmantraut; Christopher King as Chris Mara

Episode chronology
← Previous "Live Free or Die"	Next → "Hazard Pay"
- Breaking Bad season 5

"Madrigal" is the second episode of the fifth season of the American television crime drama series Breaking Bad, and the 48th episode overall. Written by the series creator Vince Gilligan and directed by Michelle MacLaren, it originally aired on AMC in the United States on July 22, 2012.

"Madrigal" received positive reviews from critics for MacLaren’s direction, writing, and the performances (particularly Banks and Fraser). The episode was seen by an estimated 2.29 million American household viewers.

== Plot ==
In Germany, Peter Schuler, an executive for Madrigal Electromotive GmbH, the parent company of Los Pollos Hermanos, kills himself with an AED as police arrive to question him about his longstanding ties to Gus Fring. Back in Albuquerque, Jesse Pinkman panics over the missing ricin cigarette, worried that someone will find it and get poisoned. Walter White hides the vial of ricin behind an electrical outlet cover in his house and creates a fake one, planting it in Jesse's Roomba when he helps search Jesse's house. Jesse finds it and tearfully laments what he believes is his own stupidity, apologizing to Walt for suspecting him of poisoning Brock Cantillo.

Walt and Jesse offer Mike Ehrmantraut an equal, three-way partnership in a new meth operation. Mike refuses, explaining that Walt is a dangerous "time bomb" and he has no intention of waiting until Walt blows everything around him to pieces. Saul Goodman suggests that with Gus eliminated, Walt can safely and cleanly quit the drug trade. However, Walt justifies rebooting the meth business by claiming that it is a golden opportunity that he cannot afford to leave behind since he is actually $40,000 in debt to Jesse after Skyler White gave over $600,000 to Ted Beneke, and paid for Hank Schrader's physical therapy. But the main obstacle to Walt and Jesse's comeback plan is the need for a new source of methylamine, the precursor to their premium-grade version of meth.

Meanwhile, Hank takes part in a meeting between the DEA and Madrigal's CEO, who claims Schuler was a lone criminal within the company and promises full cooperation. Hank's boss, ASAC George Merkert, reveals that he is being forced out of his job as punishment by his superiors for failing to heed Hank's warnings about Gus. Merkert reflects on his friendship with Gus and wonders aloud who else might be leading a double life, which seems to suddenly strike a chord with a pensive-looking Hank.

A Houston-based Madrigal executive named Lydia Rodarte-Quayle asks Mike to kill eleven men from Gus's operation in order to tie up loose ends. Mike refuses, as Gus paid them enough to keep quiet. However, when he is called in to meet with Hank and Steve Gomez, Mike learns the authorities have seized all of the offshore accounts Gus had set up for key underlings in his meth operation. Mike is affected as well since his account (set up in his 10-year-old granddaughter's name) was worth $2 million. On Mike's way into his interview at the DEA offices, he runs into a visibly scared Duane Chow—Gus's methylamine supplier—who was just leaving his own DEA interview.

Later, Chow invites Mike to his home to discuss their shared problem with the police. Mike correctly suspects that it is a setup and gets the jump on Chris, one of his former men, who has already killed Chow. Chris explains that Lydia had contracted him to kill everyone after Mike refused, as he needs the money. Mike kills Chris and later breaks into Lydia's house in Houston. As he is about to execute her, Lydia's panicked pleas about her daughter affect him. He decides to spare Lydia in exchange for her becoming Walt's new methylamine supplier. Mike calls Walt and accepts a partnership in the new meth operation.

Walt tries to resume an ordinary home life with Skyler, not accepting that she is terrified of him. While Walt joins a silent and motionless Skyler in bed for the night, he insists their lives will soon be back to normal, and makes unreciprocated sexual advances on her.

== Production ==
Breaking Bad creator and episode writer Vince Gilligan spoke about opening the episode at Madrigal: "We always like to surprise our viewers, and the idea of suddenly opening in Germany seemed like fun. We also wanted to start showing you the business of Madrigal, the company that financed Gus Fring. Is Madrigal all corrupt? Or was it just a couple of executives?" He also spoke about Jonathan Banks, who was the main focus of the episode, and Mike's evolution over the series: "It’s a testament to the great actors on this show – Aaron Paul, Dean Norris who plays Hank – that those characters became more important over time. Jonathan Banks is just fantastic in the role." When asked if Mike was watching The Caine Mutiny in the episode, Gilligan stated: "That is The Caine Mutiny, one of my very favorite movies. I was very lucky with that, actually, because it can be very expensive to use clips of movies, which is why you don't see too many clips on the show. But Caine Mutiny is owned by Sony/Columbia, our parent company. And yes, it may have some connection to where Walt is at this point." The episode marks the first appearance of Lydia Rodarte-Quayle, portrayed by Laura Fraser. The crew hoped to cast Werner Herzog as Peter Schuler, but were unable to approach him so Norbert Weisser was cast instead.

Several fake restaurant chain names were made for the headquarters of Madrigal. One of these, "Burger Matic", was actually taken from Gilligan's previous work Home Fries.

== Reception ==
=== Ratings ===
The episode was watched by approximately 2.29 million American viewers on its original broadcast, down from its series-high ratings of 2.93 million viewers the previous week. This viewer count was later matched by "'Fifty-One".

=== Critical reception ===
Ken Tucker of Entertainment Weekly called "Madrigal" "terrific", stating: "One of the methods to Breaking Bad's endless fascination is the way it unfurls maps of inter-dependence. Certain characters may like to see themselves as independent agents, as lone wolves, but everyone is dependent upon someone else – someone else's errors, or rare twinge of good conscience – and thus must remain part of a group. It's a braided metaphor for the reasons we form societies." He did, however, wish the episode ended "more forcefully" with Mike making the reluctant phone call to Walt, rather than ending with the Walt/Skyler bedroom scene. TV Fanatic's Matt Richenthal gave the episode 4.8 out of 5 stars, commenting: "Through its attention to detail, direction and dialogue, Breaking Bad possesses an uncanny ability to enrapture and enthrall. You can't help but be invested in every moment." He also commented on Jonathan Banks' performance: "Overall, just a terrific showcase this week for Jonathan Banks. His portrayal of Mike paints the picture of an exasperated career criminal who excels at the game ... and is resigned to his fate. He's funny ... and he somehow manages to be the moral center of this operation, despite his willingness to kill and kill and kill."

Matt Zoller Seitz of Vulture cited the episode as an example of great directing in television, stating that it "contained not a single dull shot" and is stylistically reminiscent of Alan J. Pakula's thriller films through Michelle MacLaren's "sense of space, light, and pacing".

The Ringer ranked "Madrigal" as the 37th best out of the 62 total Breaking Bad episodes.
