= Michelle MacLaren =

Canadian television director and producer

- Occupations: Director, producer
- Years active: 1989–present
- Notable work: Game of Thrones; The Walking Dead; Breaking Bad; Harsh Realm; The X-Files; Westworld; Booker; Better Call Saul
- Relatives: Ashleigh Banfield (cousin)

Michelle Maxwell MacLaren is a Canadian television director and producer. She has directed episodes of The X-Files, Better Call Saul, Breaking Bad, The Walking Dead, Game of Thrones, and Westworld.

MacLaren won two back-to-back Primetime Emmy Awards for producing Breaking Bad in 2013 and 2014.

== Early life ==
MacLaren grew up in Vancouver, British Columbia. She graduated from Queen's University in Kingston, Ontario. MacLaren is a cousin of television anchor Ashleigh Banfield.

== Career ==
"I don't see myself as a female director, I see myself as a director who happens to be a woman."

MacLaren made her directorial debut on the season nine episode of The X-Files, "John Doe", which was written by her future Breaking Bad collaborator Vince Gilligan. She approaches shooting action sequences as mathematical deconstruction and likes using multiple cameras and wide lenses.

She was nominated for six Primetime Emmy Awards, all for Breaking Bad: one for directing the episode "One Minute" (season 3, episode 7) in 2010, one for directing the episode "Gliding Over All" (season 5, episode 8) in 2013, and the other four in 2010, 2012, 2013 and 2014 for Outstanding Drama Series, on which she served as an executive producer, winning in 2013 and 2014. She was also nominated for three Producers Guild of America Award for Best Episodic Drama for Breaking Bad, winning in 2014 and 2015. On the tenth anniversary of the premiere of Breaking Bad, io9 singled out MacLaren among the breakout directors on the series as the MVP, noting she directed 11 episodes, more than any other director.

In June 2014, it was announced MacLaren had signed a two-year first-look deal with HBO.

In November 2014, it was announced that MacLaren would develop the script and direct Wonder Woman, the iconic character's first solo cinematic appearance and the fourth installment of the DC Extended Universe. However, in April 2015 MacLaren left the project due to "creative differences".

She was the executive producer of and directed the pilot for David Simon's HBO drama The Deuce. She was the first director hired and established the overall 1970s tone and style of the show.

In August 2016, it was announced that MacLaren would direct the film adaptation of Kristin Hannah's novel The Nightingale. She was attracted to the prospect of directing The Nightingale because it is a "muscular" project and the female characters are unsuspecting heroes.

The same year she also directed the ninth episode of the HBO series Westworld. When the directors of the final season of Game of Thrones were announced, several prominent news sites, including Polygon and Nerdist, expressed disappointment that MacLaren, the only woman to direct on the series, was not included.

In December 2017, MacLaren visited the Dubai International Film Festival as a guest of OSN.

On January 31, 2018, MacLaren was confirmed as director for the film Cowboy Ninja Viking.

She is developing a miniseries for HBO with Breaking Bad co-producer Vince Gilligan called Raven, based on the Jonestown massacre.

== Filmography ==
Film

- Population 436 (2006)

TV series

Year	Title	Director	Executive Producer	Episode(s)
2000–2002	The X-Files	Yes	Co-Executive	"John Doe"
2002	Without a Trace	Yes	No	"Midnight Sun"
2003	John Doe	Yes	No	"John D.O.A."
2005	Night Stalker	No	Yes	"Pilot"
2006	Law & Order: Special Victims Unit	Yes	No	"Infected"
2006	Kyle XY	Yes	No	"Blame it on the Rain"
2009–2013	Breaking Bad	Yes	Yes	"To'hajiilee"
2009–2013	Breaking Bad	Yes	Yes	"Buried"
2009–2013	Breaking Bad	Yes	Yes	"Gliding Over All"
2009–2013	Breaking Bad	Yes	Yes	"Madrigal"
2009–2013	Breaking Bad	Yes	Yes	"Salud"
2009–2013	Breaking Bad	Yes	Yes	"Shotgun"
2009–2013	Breaking Bad	Yes	Yes	"Thirty-Eight Snub"
2009–2013	Breaking Bad	Yes	Yes	"Abiquiu"
2009–2013	Breaking Bad	Yes	Yes	"One Minute"
2009–2013	Breaking Bad	Yes	Yes	"I.F.T."
2009–2013	Breaking Bad	Yes	Yes	"4 Days Out"
2010	Memphis Beat	Yes	No	"Suspicious Minds"
2010	Lie to Me	Yes	No	"Dirty Loyal"
2010	The Event	Yes	No	"Your World to Take"
2010–2014	The Walking Dead	Yes	No	"A"
2010–2014	The Walking Dead	Yes	No	"Pretty Much Dead Already"
2010–2014	The Walking Dead	Yes	No	"Guts"
2011	Camelot	Yes	No	"Igraine"
2011	Hell on Wheels	Yes	No	"Revelations"
2012	NCIS	Yes	No	"Need to Know"
2012	The River	Yes	No	"Doctor Emmet Cole"
2013	Chicks 'n' Guns	Yes	Yes	Breaking Bad bonus scene
2013–2014	Game of Thrones	Yes	No	"First of His Name"
2013–2014	Game of Thrones	Yes	No	"Oathkeeper"
2013–2014	Game of Thrones	Yes	No	"Second Sons"
2013–2014	Game of Thrones	Yes	No	"The Bear and the Maiden Fair"
2014	The Leftovers	Yes	No	"Cairo"
2015–2022	Better Call Saul	Yes	No	"Nippy"
2015–2022	Better Call Saul	Yes	No	"Breathe"
2015–2022	Better Call Saul	Yes	No	"Mijo"
2016	Westworld	Yes	No	"The Well-Tempered Clavier"
2017	Modern Family	Yes	No	"All Things Being Equal"
2017–2019	The Deuce	Yes	Yes	"My Name Is Ruby"
2017–2019	The Deuce	Yes	Yes	"Pilot"
2019	The Morning Show	Yes	No	"Lonely at the Top"
2021	Coyote	Yes	No	"Silver or Lead"
2021	Coyote	Yes	No	"Call of the Void"
2024	Constellation	Yes	Yes	"Live and Let Die"
2024	Constellation	Yes	Yes	"The Wounded Angel"

TV movies

Year	Title	Writer	Producer
1992	Shame	No	Yes
1993	For the Love of My Child: The Anissa Ayala Story	No	Yes
1993	Moment of Truth: A Child Too Many	No	Yes
1994	Moment of Truth: To Walk Again	No	Yes
1994	Moment of Truth: Broken Pledges	No	Yes
1994	Heart of a Child	No	Yes
1994	Moment of Truth: A Mother's Deception	No	Yes
1995	The Other Mother: A Moment of Truth Movie	No	Yes
1997	A Child's Wish	No	Yes
1998	Beauty	No	Yes
1999	A Song from the Heart	Yes	Executive

== Awards and nominations ==
Primetime Emmy Awards

Year	Category	Title	Episode	Result
2010	Outstanding Drama Series	Breaking Bad		Nominated
2012	Outstanding Drama Series	Breaking Bad		Nominated
2013	Outstanding Drama Series	Breaking Bad		Won
2014	Outstanding Drama Series	Breaking Bad		Won
2010	Outstanding Directing for a Drama Series	Breaking Bad	"One Minute"	Nominated
2013	Outstanding Directing for a Drama Series	Breaking Bad	"Gliding Over All"	Nominated

Producers Guild of America

Year	Category	Title	Result
2011	Best Episodic Drama	Breaking Bad	Nominated
2013	Best Episodic Drama	Breaking Bad	Nominated
2014	Best Episodic Drama	Breaking Bad	Won
2015	Best Episodic Drama	Breaking Bad	Won
