= Hazard Pay =

- Breaking Bad episode
- Episode no.: Season 5 Episode 3
- Directed by: Adam Bernstein
- Written by: Peter Gould
- Cinematography by: Michael Slovis
- Editing by: Skip Macdonald
- Original air date: July 29, 2012
- Running time: 47 minutes

Guest appearances
- Matt Jones as Badger; Emily Rios as Andrea Cantillo; Jesse Plemons as Todd Alquist; Mike Batayeh as Dennis Markowsky; Franc Ross as Ira; Charles Baker as Skinny Pete; Lavell Crawford as Huell Babineaux; Ian Posada as Brock Cantillo; Chris Freihofer as Dan Wachsberger

Episode chronology
← Previous "Madrigal"	Next → "Fifty-One"
- Breaking Bad season 5

"Hazard Pay" is the third episode of the fifth season of the American television drama series Breaking Bad, and the 49th overall episode of the series. Written by Peter Gould and directed by Adam Bernstein, it originally aired on AMC in the United States on July 29, 2012.

== Plot ==
Mike Ehrmantraut and his attorney spend an entire day visiting his former subordinates in jail who are under heavy scrutiny from the police due to their association with Gus Fring. Mike reassures them they will get their compensation.

While scouting for a new location for a meth laboratory, Walter White proposes using a pest removal company to secretly make meth in their clients' homes. Vamonos Pest, a local pest removal company, is perfect for this as the owner and his employees are already criminals. They agree to facilitate Walt and Jesse Pinkman cooking in their clients' homes. The first cook at the mobile site is a success, and afterward, Walt feigns enthusiasm for Jesse's relationship with Andrea Cantillo, but hints that Jesse should break up with her after mentioning the problems it would cause if she discovered his secret life.

While discussing Walt's upcoming 51st birthday with Marie Schrader at the car wash, Skyler White begins to light a cigarette. As Marie begins to confront her about smoking, Skyler suffers a nervous breakdown, repeatedly shouting "shut up". Marie confronts Walt at home about Skyler's breakdown and demands to know the truth. Walt tells her about Skyler's affair with Ted Beneke and that her breakdown was due to stress over Ted's recent accident.

Mike allocates the money earned from the first cook, but Walt becomes upset when so much of it is given to dealers, mules, Saul Goodman, and Vamonos Pest. Walt becomes further angered when he learns of the hazard pay to Mike's old henchmen but eventually relents. Walt calculates that the final amount taken home by the partners was less than what he was making when he was working for Gus. Jesse, who reveals that he broke off the relationship with Andrea, tells Walt that he was "looking at it wrong." Jesse explains to Walt that under Gus, they were employees, but as owners, they were actually making more considering the volume of the output. Walt, however, hints that they may need to get rid of some of the other members of the team.

== Production ==
Charles Baker's ability to play the piano was noticed by the writers of the show and in the episode, his character Skinny Pete plays a keyboard piece (Solfeggieto in C minor composed in 1766 by Carl Phillip Emanuel Bach) on an electric keyboard.

== Reception ==
=== Ratings ===
The episode was watched by approximately 2.20 million American viewers in its original broadcast, a slight drop from the previous episode.

=== Critical reception ===
Allison Keene of Collider was originally going to rate the episode with a C, but gave it a B for the "Skinny Pete scene and the cook montage", adding: "Introducing Skinny Pete in 'Hazard Pay' with him artfully and flawlessly dancing through a piano melody on a keyboard in the music store was funny, but also deeply sad." She added about the cook: "Every season Walt and Jesse seem to find some foolproof place to cook in peace, and I always get a weird sense of calm. The RV, the lab, and now a mobile meth lab in bug-bombed houses. It's a stroke of genius, and one that can nearly be 'ripped from the headlines'." Entertainment Weekly's Ken Tucker called "Hazard Pay" "a marvelous episode, full of problem-solving and execution, along with a few wild-card emotional moments." Tucker particularly liked Mike's money-division scene at the end of the episode, calling it "a beautifully simple lesson in economics, laid out clearly for both Walter and Jesse, and for us."

In 2019 The Ringer ranked "Hazard Pay" 62nd out of 62 total Breaking Bad episodes. Claire McClear wrote of Walt meeting Brock for the first time as displaying that Walt was "a monster now, make no mistake," considering that he had recently poisoned the boy.
