= Michael Batayeh =

American actor (1970–2023)

- Born: December 27, 1970; Detroit, Michigan, U.S.
- Died: June 1, 2023 (aged 52); Ypsilanti, Michigan, U.S.
- Occupations: Comedian; Actor
- Notable work: Breaking Bad

Michael Anthony Batayeh (December 27, 1970 – June 1, 2023) was an American comedian and actor. He played Dennis Markowski, the manager of the industrial laundromat that was a coverup for a meth lab in Breaking Bad.

== Career ==
Batayeh attended Wayne State University before dropping out and moving to Los Angeles to pursue a career in acting. He appeared in It's Always Sunny in Philadelphia and The Bernie Mac Show. His most prominent role came as Dennis Markowski in the hit series Breaking Bad.

== Personal life ==
Batayeh was born to Jordanian Orthodox Christian parents. His father was a factory worker for Ford Motor Company. During his time in acting, Batayeh divided his time between California, and Michigan.

== Death ==
On June 1, 2023, Batayeh was found dead in his home by Pittsfield Township police in Ypsilanti, Michigan at age 52. His sister, Ida Vergalla, claimed that he had died of a heart attack. However, a report by the Washtenaw County Medical Examiner's Office found that he died by "asphyxiation by hanging", and that his death was a possible suicide. His family said "He will be greatly missed by those who loved him and his great ability to bring laughter and joy to so many".
