= Charles Baker (actor) =

American actor, writer, and director

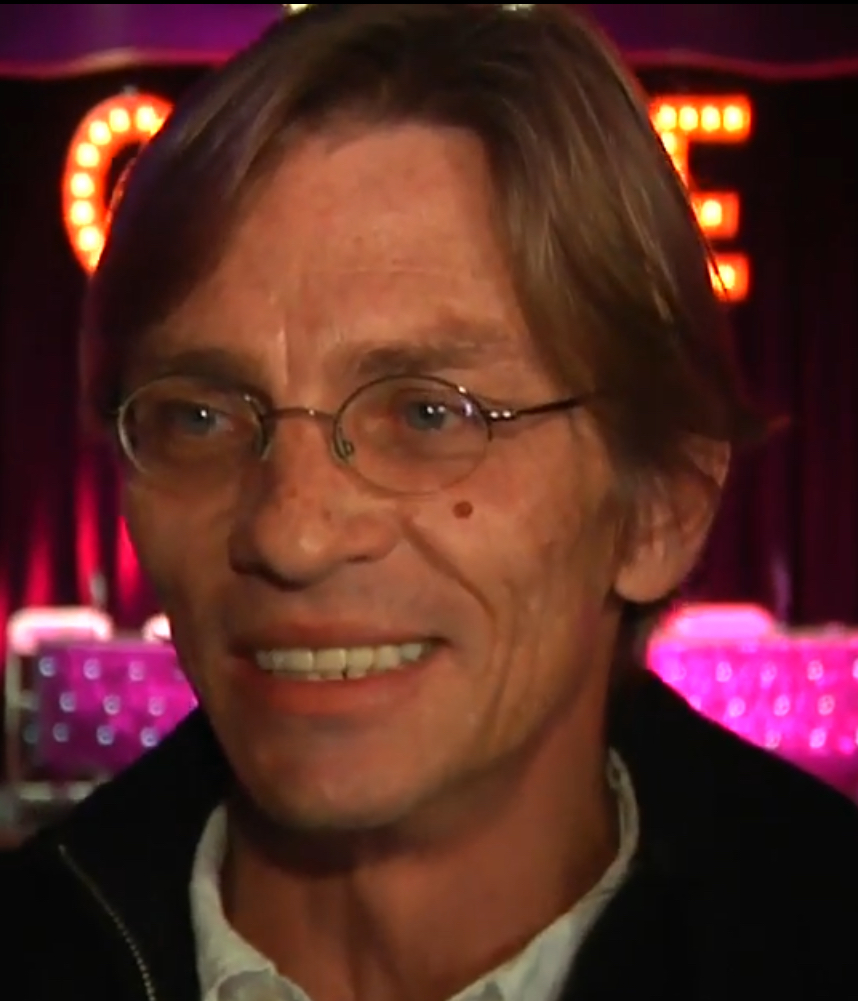
- Baker in 2016
- Born: Charles Edward Baker; 1970 or 1971 (age 55–56); Washington, D.C., U.S.
- Occupation: Actor
- Years active: 1999–present
- Spouse: Rachel Baker (m. 2002)
- Children: 2

Charles Baker (born 1970 or 1971) is an American actor. He is best known for playing Skinny Pete on the AMC series Breaking Bad. He has also had recurring roles on the NBC series The Blacklist, as well as the second season of the HBO Max series The Pitt.

He reprised the role of Skinny Pete in the film El Camino: A Breaking Bad Movie, which was released on Netflix on October 11, 2019.

== Early life ==
Baker was born in Washington, D.C., the son of a U.S. Army colonel. His family moved frequently during his childhood. Though he had aspirations to become a teacher, he double majored in music and theater in college.

== Career ==
Baker began appearing in small budget movies including Playing Dead and Fat Girls. He also performed in dubs for multiple anime series, such as One Piece, Baki the Grappler, and D.Gray-man. In 2006, he wrote, composed, produced, and directed his own short film called The Waterson Project. In 2007, he was cast in the direct-to-video sequel of Walking Tall. In 2008, he was cast in the horror film Splinter. He was cast in Terrence Malick's To the Wonder in 2011.

He was cast in Breaking Bad as Skinny Pete, a close associate and friend of Jesse Pinkman who served time in prison. His original character name was supposed to be "skinny stoner" in the audition. He was called back a few days later and his part was expanded. After the filming of his first episode, he was called and asked to return for future episodes. His ability to play the piano was noticed by the writers of the show and in the Season Five episode "Hazard Pay", he plays a piano piece (CPE Bach - Solfeggietto) on a keyboard. In early 2013, he was cast in the television pilot of The Blacklist starring James Spader. In mid 2013, Baker was cast in Ain't Them Bodies Saints. In mid-2014, he was cast in Wild starring Reese Witherspoon. He was also cast in a recurring role in TNT's Murder in the First. He was cast as a Mandalorian on The Mandalorian in 2023.

== Personal life ==
Baker married his wife Rachel on April 27, 2002. Together they have two children.

== Filmography ==
=== Film ===
Year	Title	Role	Notes
2006	Fat Girls	Roller Rink Attendant	
2007	Walking Tall: The Payback	Nate	
2008	Splinter	Blake Sherman Jr.	
2009	Shroud	William "Billy" Sidehammer	
2010	Temple Grandin	Billy	
2011	Fright Flick	Chase	
2012	To the Wonder	Carpenter	
2013	Ain't Them Bodies Saints	Bear	
2013	Flutter	Lonny	
2014	Wild	TJ	
2016	Approaching the Unknown	Captain Frank Worsely	
2016	The Neon Demon	Mikey	
2016	Alterscape	Sam Miller	
2018	Eleven Eleven	Tim Faris	
2019	El Camino: A Breaking Bad Movie	Skinny Pete	
2024	Horizon: An American Saga – Chapter 2	Drifter	
2026	You Can't Win	Fremont Older	Filmed in 2012.

=== Television ===
Year	Title	Role	Notes
1999–2004	One Piece	Various Characters	English dub 27 episodes
2001	Baki the Grappler	Kohei	English dub Episode: "Here Comes the King"
2003	The Galaxy Railways	Hijacker	English dub Episode: "Big One Hijacked"
2005	Walker, Texas Ranger: Trial by Fire	Herman Van Horne	Television film
2006	Prison Break	Camper Guy	Episode: "Manhunt"
2006	D.Gray-man	Additional Characters	English dub 2 episodes
2007	El Cazador de la Bruja	Jose	English dub Episode: "A Woman Who Puts It On"
2007	Claymore	Bandits' Head	Episode dub
2008	Comanche Moon	Monkey John	Miniseries
2008–2013	Breaking Bad	Skinny Pete	15 episodes
2010	In Plain Sight	TJ	Episode: "Father Goes West"
2010	The Good Guys	Wolf / Cellmate	2 episodes
2010	Detroit 1-8-7	Marcus Mosier	Episode: "Pharmacy Double/Bullet Train"
2010	Temple Grandin	Billy	Television film
2011	Chase	Wiry Inmate	Episode: "Seven Years"
2013	NTSF:SD:SUV::	Milo	Episode: "Trading Faces"
2013	The Blacklist	Newton Phillips	3 episodes
2014	Murder in the First	Chris Walton	6 episodes
2015	Chicago P.D.	Terry Warfield	Episode: "What Puts You On That Ledge"
2016	Colony	Spider	Episode: "Pilot"
2017	Grimm	Dan	Episode: "Breakfast in Bed"
2017	Brooklyn Nine-Nine	George Judy	Episode: "The Fugitive (Part 2)"
2017	Lethal Weapon	Peter Scarelli	Episode: "Lawmen"
2019	The Rookie	Terry Wright	Episode: "Homefront"
2020	Perry Mason	Stanislaw Nowak	4 episodes
2021	CSI: Vegas	Bill Dwyer	Episode: “Legacy”
2022	1883	Henry Weaver	
2023	Mayor of Kingstown	Horace	Episode: “The Pool”
2023	The Mandalorian	Survivor Scout	2 episodes
TBA	Driving Test	Spoons	
2026	The Pitt	Troy Digby	6 episodes
