= Todd Alquist =

Breaking Bad character

- Breaking Bad character
- Jesse Plemons as Todd Alquist
- First appearance: "Hazard Pay"; Breaking Bad; July 29, 2012
- Last appearance: Snow Globe; February 16, 2020
- Created by: Vince Gilligan
- Portrayed by: Jesse Plemons

In-universe information
- Full name: Todd Alquist
- Occupation: Methamphetamine manufacturer; Lab assistant for Walter White; Pest exterminator at Vamonos Pest Control
- Relatives: Jack Welker (uncle)
- Nationality: American
- Date of death: September 7, 2010
- Cause of Death: Strangled by Jesse Pinkman

Todd Alquist is a fictional character in the crime drama television series Breaking Bad and its spin-off film El Camino: A Breaking Bad Movie. He is portrayed by the American actor Jesse Plemons.

Introduced in Breaking Bad season 5, Todd is a pest exterminator for Vamonos Pest Control, which is used by Walter White, Jesse Pinkman, and Mike Ehrmantraut to discreetly produce methamphetamine. Todd helps the trio rob a train of methylamine and later replaces Jesse as Walter's assistant in cooking meth, eventually becoming a leading meth producer for Lydia Rodarte-Quayle, whom he has a romantic interest in, after Walter's retirement. Todd commits increasingly violent acts while maintaining a calm and polite demeanor.

Todd's character garnered praise and was included on several lists of the best television villains. He has also been subject to analysis due to his lack of remorse and sociopathic tendencies, and him being a narrative mirror to several characters in the show.

== Creation and characterization ==
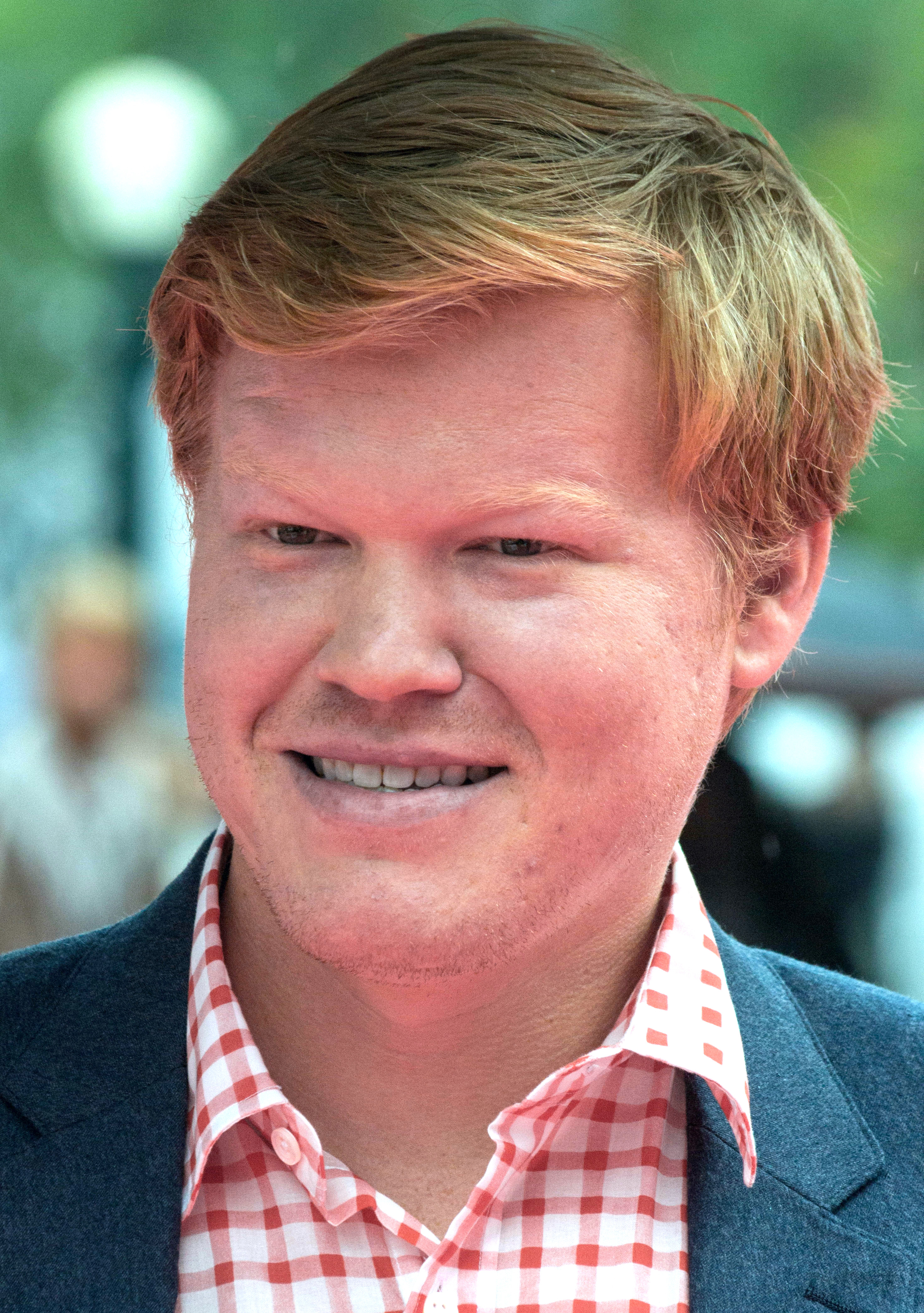
Jesse Plemons, who plays Todd

Todd is portrayed by American actor Jesse Plemons. He is depicted as a polite and soft-spoken criminal who is a part of his uncle Jack Welker's white supremacist gang. Todd has often been described as a sociopath, (Note: Attributed to several sources.) including by Breaking Bad creator Vince Gilligan. Plemons described his character as an "ambush predator".

Gilligan expressed regret for not featuring Todd more in the main series, which influenced him in the creation of a sequel, El Camino: A Breaking Bad Movie. Gilligan also described Todd as "the most weirdly likeable sociopath" that he has ever seen.

== Fictional character biography ==
=== Season 5 ===
Todd is the nephew of Jack Welker, a member of the Aryan Brotherhood. Todd is introduced as an employee of Vamonos Pest, a pest control company used by Walter White, Jesse Pinkman, and Mike Ehrmantraut as cover for their new methamphetamine production operation. Todd demonstrates initiative and discretion, quickly earning Walter's approval. He assists in setting up the equipment during cooks and follows orders without question.

When Lydia Rodarte-Quayle informs the group that their methylamine supply is being tracked, she suggests hijacking a freight train carrying the chemical. Todd participates in the heist alongside Walter, Jesse, and Mike. Although the operation is successful, Todd shoots and kills a young boy, Drew Sharp, who witnesses the heist. Jesse is horrified, while Todd is indifferent. Mike and Jesse decide to leave the business, but Walter continues, keeping Todd on as his assistant. Todd begins to learn how to cook meth under Walter's guidance. Although he is unable to match Walter's product quality, he manages a respectable purity level. Todd introduces Walter to his uncle Jack. Jack and his men murder ten imprisoned associates of Mike in a coordinated attack to protect Walter from investigation. Todd and Walter work together for several months. After Walter retires, Todd works for meth distributor Declan, but is soon fired for accidentally starting a fire in the lab. Lydia meets with Declan, requesting either a raise in the quality of the meth or the rehiring of Todd, both of which Declan refuses. On Lydia's orders, Jack and his gang, including Todd, shoot and kill Declan and his crew and then steal their lab equipment.

Todd continues cooking meth under the gang's supervision. Lydia hires the gang to maintain production for her distribution network, but Todd struggles to maintain the blue meth that she wants. When Jesse is captured after the gang murders DEA agents Hank Schrader and Steve Gomez, Todd suggests keeping Jesse alive to improve the meth quality, despite Walter's request to kill him. Jesse is then held in captivity and forced to cook under threat. When Todd learns that Walter's wife Skyler White is under investigation by the police, he and two members of the gang threaten her into not giving information about Lydia on her orders. Todd develops an unsettling interest in Lydia and attempts to impress her with his professionalism and loyalty. He remains polite and soft-spoken while participating in increasingly violent acts, including murdering Andrea Cantillo, Jesse's ex-girlfriend, as punishment for Jesse's attempted escape. Todd tortures Jesse during his enslavement, though unlike the other gang members, he also shows him some degree of mercy. Walter later decides to exact revenge on Jack's gang and approaches Todd and Lydia under the guise of offering to teach Todd a more efficient method to cook meth. They accept his offer, but secretly plan to have the gang kill him. Todd is ultimately killed by Jesse during Walter's confrontation with the gang at their compound, where Jesse strangles him with a chain. Todd's death marks the end of the gang's operation and Jesse's captivity.

=== El Camino ===
Plemons reprises his role as Todd in the sequel film El Camino: A Breaking Bad Movie in flashback scenes taking place during Jesse's captivity. (Note: After the events of "Granite State".) In the scenes, Todd takes Jesse out of his cage under the pretense of helping with chores. He drives Jesse to his apartment, where he calmly reveals that he has strangled his cleaning lady for discovering hidden money. Todd forces Jesse to help dispose of the body. While they are in the Painted Desert burying the body, Jesse grabs Todd's gun from the car and considers killing him. Todd calmly coerces Jesse to give him the gun, which he does, and offers to buy him pizza. In the present, Jesse returns to Todd's apartment to retrieve the money Todd hid. Another flashback shows Todd and fellow gang member Kenny tormenting Jesse while supervising the construction of new restraints for him following his escape attempt.

== Reception ==
=== Critical response ===
Todd's characterization received widespread critical acclaim. He has been described as one of the most evil characters on television and on Breaking Bad by Rolling Stone and Vulture. Todd was named the best television villain of 2013 by IGN. Entertainment Weekly called Todd the most dangerous villain in Breaking Bad due to his recklessness.

=== Analysis ===
Vulture noted that Todd served as a narrative mirror to several characters in the series, including Mike, Jesse, Walter and Skyler due to his reflection of their mannerisms. His fixation on Lydia Rodarte-Quayle, marked by a scene where he lingers over a mug stained with her lipstick, was cited by the website as a rare moment of overt sensuality in a show otherwise known for a desexualized tone. The Atlantic highlighted the fact that Todd kept Drew Sharp's spider after the murder, interpreting it as a symbolic act reminiscent of a killer preserving a trophy. In an interview with Rolling Stone, Jesse Plemons stated that Todd was "really pragmatic" and someone who "likes having jobs to do, likes tasks." Plemons explained that Todd viewed the train heist as "something that was really exciting, something he could really put his energy into", and that killing the young witness was, in Todd's mind, a necessary act to preserve the success of the mission.
