= Lydia Rodarte-Quayle =

Breaking Bad character

- Breaking Bad / Better Call Saul character
- Laura Fraser as Lydia Rodarte-Quayle
- First appearance: "Madrigal"; Breaking Bad; July 22, 2012
- Last appearance: "JMM"; Better Call Saul; March 30, 2020
- Created by: Vince Gilligan
- Portrayed by: Laura Fraser

In-universe information
- Full name: Lydia Rodarte-Quayle
- Occupation: Business executive at Madrigal Electromotive; Methamphetamine distributor
- Relatives: Kiira Rodarte-Quayle (daughter)
- Nationality: American
- Status: Presumed deceased
- Cause of death: Ricin poisoning

Lydia Rodarte-Quayle is a fictional character in the crime drama television series Breaking Bad and its prequel series Better Call Saul. She is portrayed by Scottish actress Laura Fraser.

Introduced in fifth season, Lydia is a business executive at Madrigal Electromotive who oversees the company's logistics operations. She secretly helps Gus Fring obtain chemicals for his methamphetamine operation and later becomes involved with Walter White and Todd Alquist's uncle Jack Welker in his criminal organization. Lydia is also a single mother with a daughter, and her concern for her daughter is part of her motivation.

== Creation and characterization ==
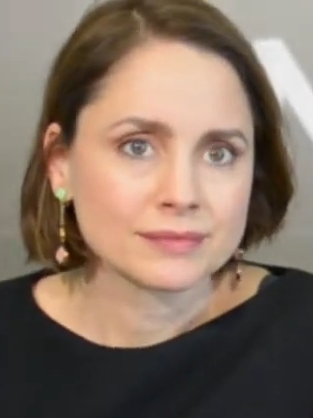
Laura Fraser, who plays Lydia Rodarte-Quayle

Lydia Rodarte-Quayle is portrayed by Scottish actress Laura Fraser. Fraser was cast after auditioning for the role and later performed a diner scene with Jonathan Banks, who plays Mike Ehrmantraut. Fraser had not watched Breaking Bad before getting the role, but watched the first four seasons after being cast. Fraser described Lydia as "extremely highly strung, calculating, enterprising" and said that she had learned to survive at all costs and developed skills to do so. She also said that her character was constantly trying to regain control of her situation and that she did not know whether the character would survive from one scene to the next.

Fraser said that Lydia's concern for her daughter influenced the way she understood the character's actions. She described the daughter as an important part of how Lydia justified her actions to herself. Fraser also described her character as being in a constant state of "fight-or-flight" while discussing the physical strain of playing the character. Fraser discussed Lydia's position within the corporate world represented by Madrigal Electromotive. She said that Lydia's role allowed the series to show a side of the drug trade connected to large businesses rather than only street-level criminal activity.

In a 2013 interview with Rolling Stone, Fraser described Lydia as a "clean-cut, bonkers sociopath" and said that the character took herself seriously while believing that she was always right. She also discussed Lydia's Louboutin shoes, saying that the red soles represented the bloodshed for which Lydia was responsible. Fraser also described her character as "extremely self-righteous and irritating" and said that she took herself too seriously. In developing the character, Fraser imagined that Lydia had grown up in a group home, had an unhappy and uncertain childhood, and had been abandoned as a child, which she believed contributed to Lydia's loneliness and alienation. Fraser described her character's decision-making as irrational and mentally deranged, reflecting her distorted moral compass and involvement in the criminal underworld. She noted a contradiction in Lydia's character, pointing out that she can easily order a mass murder but shies away from witnessing such violence herself, which she viewed as "levels of denial" that Lydia is unaware of.

Lydia's tea, which consists of chamomile tea with soy milk and stevia, was later discussed by creator Vince Gilligan. Gilligan said there was no hidden meaning behind the choice. He said that he personally put milk in chamomile tea and that soy milk was chosen because it sounded healthy. Fraser also discussed filming Lydia's final scene in the series finale, "Felina". She said that her final day on the set involved filming Lydia's death scene and that she was made to look physically ill after being poisoned with ricin. She recalled filming the scene with Bryan Cranston, who plays Walter White.

== Appearances ==
=== Better Call Saul ===
==== Season 3 ====
Lydia appears in Better Call Saul during the events preceding Breaking Bad. In 2003, she accompanies Gus Fring while he examines an industrial laundry facility that Gus plans to use for a secret methamphetamine laboratory. The facility later becomes the location of Gus's underground lab. Lydia later meets Mike Ehrmantraut at Madrigal's Houston office. She explains her concerns about Mike's activities involving the company's security and becomes involved in arrangements connected to Gus's operation. Although she is nervous about the risks involved, she continues to work with Gus.

==== Season 4 ====
Lydia continues to work at Madrigal and becomes involved in the security arrangements surrounding the company's illegal activities. She asks Mike to stop testing the company's security, but Gus later allows Mike to continue working with Madrigal.

==== Season 5 ====
Lydia meets with Gus and Peter Schuler, the head of Madrigal's fast food division, to discuss Lalo Salamanca, who is causing problems for Gus's operation while in prison. Lydia suggests that Lalo be killed in prison, but Gus rejects the idea because of the attention it would bring to them.

=== Breaking Bad ===
Lydia works for Madrigal Electromotive as its Head of Logistics. Through her position, she secretly assists Gus in obtaining chemicals and other resources for his methamphetamine operation. She is also involved in plans to distribute Gus's meth to the Czech Republic before his death.

==== Season 5 ====
After the deaths of Gus and Schuler, Lydia attends a meeting between Madrigal executives and the Drug Enforcement Administration. Fearing that the people connected to Gus's operation could expose her involvement, she asks Mike to kill eleven imprisoned associates. Mike refuses, but Lydia later hires Chris Mara, one of the men on her list, to kill Mike and the others. Mike eventually enters Lydia's home in Houston, intending to kill her. Lydia asks Mike to leave her body where her daughter will find it so that her daughter will not believe she abandoned her. Mike does not kill her and instead asks whether she can still obtain methylamine. Lydia agrees to help him obtain it.

Lydia provides methylamine to Mike's group and later helps them obtain more. She becomes involved with Walter White, Jesse Pinkman and Mike after learning that their supply is limited. Lydia also discovers that Mike has placed a tracking device on one of her methylamine barrels and becomes suspicious of him. Lydia later tells Walter, Jesse and Mike about a large shipment of methylamine being transported by train. Walter and Jesse use the information to plan a train robbery. During the robbery, Todd Alquist kills Drew Sharp, a young boy who witnesses the event. After Mike and Jesse leave the business, Lydia meets Walter and gives him the names of Mike's imprisoned associates. Walter later arranges their deaths. Lydia also proposes expanding the meth business into the Czech Republic, using Madrigal's international distribution network.

After Walter retires from the meth business, Lydia continues working with Todd and Jack Welker's gang. She meets with Walter at the A1A Car Wash and asks him to return to the operation because Todd's meth does not meet her expectations. Walter refuses, and Lydia later approaches Declan, the distributor who took over Walter's operation. Lydia meets Declan and criticizes the quality of the meth being produced by his organization. She suggests that Todd should take over the cooking, but Declan refuses. Jack and his men subsequently kill Declan and the other members of his crew and take control of the lab. Lydia continues to work with Todd and Jack's organization as they produce meth for her distribution network. She remains dissatisfied with Todd's product and pushes him to improve its quality.

After Jesse is captured, Lydia becomes involved in the decision to keep him alive so that he can continue producing high-quality meth. Todd develops an interest in Lydia, while she remains focused on maintaining the business. Lydia later asks Jack's gang to deal with Skyler White and other potential threats to her operation. Lydia meets Todd, while Walter's return to the meth business becomes part of a plan that leads to Jack's compound. Lydia arranges a meeting between Walter and Jack's gang, while secretly intending for them to kill him. After Walter attacks the compound, Lydia calls Todd to confirm that Walter has been killed. Walter answers Todd's phone and tells Lydia that he had replaced the stevia in her tea with ricin earlier in the day. Lydia is visibly ill during the call.

=== Fate ===
Following Walter's attack on Jack's compound, a news report heard in El Camino: A Breaking Bad Movie identifies an unnamed woman from Houston who was poisoned by Walter. The woman is reported to be in critical condition and not expected to survive. The report does not explicitly state that she dies, but the woman is understood to be Lydia.

== Reception ==
=== Critical response ===
Lydia's role in the later part of Breaking Bad was discussed by several television critics. K.M. McFarland of Boing Boing described Lydia as someone who approached the drug trade from a removed perspective and wanted to keep her hands clean. He noted that her decision to have Todd and his associates take over the meth operation showed her lack of understanding of the violence involved in the business.

In his review of "Buried", Paul Martinovic of Den of Geek discussed Lydia's involvement in the attack on Declan's group. He described the scene in which Lydia kept her eyes closed while being led past the bodies as showing her attempt to distance herself from the violence she had helped create. Time also discussed Lydia's role in the same scene in "Buried", describing the scene as a reflection of Lydia's attempt to avoid confronting the consequences of her actions.

The Chicago Sun-Times described Lydia as an unlikely figure in the meth business and focused on her role in arranging the takeover of Declan's operation. The review also compared her reaction to the massacre to the "three wise monkeys", noting her efforts to avoid seeing the violence she had caused. Todd VanDerWerff of the Los Angeles Times was less positive about Lydia's storyline in "Buried", writing that the scenes involving Lydia and Todd seemed out of place and expressing hope that they would lead to a larger storyline.

In its review of "Felina", Slant Magazine discussed Lydia's poisoning by Walt and described her as a character who had repeatedly left the violent work of the drug trade to others. The WBUR review also noted Lydia's poisoning as part of the conclusion of Walt's story and described her as one of the characters affected by his final actions. Hank Stuever of The Washington Post mentioned Lydia's poisoning in his review of the series finale, describing Walt's use of the Stevia packet as one of the acts of revenge carried out during the episode.

=== Analysis ===
Mollie Wilson O'Reilly of Commonweal viewed Lydia's death as part of the consequences left behind by the series' ending. In her review of "Felina", she noted that Lydia's daughter is left without a mother, placing Lydia's death alongside the effects of Walter's actions on the families of other characters.
