= List of Breaking Bad episodes =

Episodes of American television drama

Breaking Bad is an American television drama series created by Vince Gilligan for the cable network AMC. The series follows Walter White (Bryan Cranston), a 50-year-old high school chemistry teacher in Albuquerque, New Mexico. After White is diagnosed with terminal lung cancer, he uses his chemistry expertise to cook crystal meth, assisted by his former student Jesse Pinkman (Aaron Paul), to secure his family's (played by Anna Gunn and RJ Mitte) inheritance before he dies.

During the course of the series, 62 episodes of Breaking Bad aired over five seasons. The pilot episode first aired on January 20, 2008, and the series finale first aired on September 29, 2013. Breaking Bad: Original Minisodes, which consisted of several one- to five-minute clips, released 17 short episodes over the course of three years throughout Breaking Bad's run.

On October 11, 2019, Netflix released El Camino: A Breaking Bad Movie, a feature film continuation of Breaking Bad, written and directed by Gilligan. An additional short film Snow Globe: A Breaking Bad Short was released on February 17, 2020.

== Series overview ==
Season	Episodes		Originally released	
Season	Episodes		First released	Last released
1	7		January 20, 2008	March 9, 2008
2	13		March 8, 2009	May 31, 2009
3	13		March 21, 2010	June 13, 2010
4	13		July 17, 2011	October 9, 2011
5	16	8	July 15, 2012	September 2, 2012
5	16	8	August 11, 2013	September 29, 2013
Film			October 11, 2019	

== Episodes ==
=== Season 1 (2008) ===
No. overall	No. in season	Title	Directed by	Written by	Original release date	U.S. viewers (millions)
1	1	"Pilot"	Vince Gilligan	Vince Gilligan	January 20, 2008	1.41
2	2	"Cat's in the Bag..."	Adam Bernstein	Vince Gilligan	January 27, 2008	1.49
3	3	"...And the Bag's in the River"	Adam Bernstein	Vince Gilligan	February 10, 2008	1.08
4	4	"Cancer Man"	Jim McKay	Vince Gilligan	February 17, 2008	1.09
5	5	"Gray Matter"	Tricia Brock	Patty Lin	February 24, 2008	0.97 (Note: The data can be calculated by taking the season's total number of viewers (8.61 million) and subtracting the official totals from each of the other season one episodes.)
6	6	"Crazy Handful of Nothin'"	Bronwen Hughes	George Mastras	March 2, 2008	1.07
7	7	"A No-Rough-Stuff-Type Deal"	Tim Hunter	Peter Gould	March 9, 2008	1.50

=== Season 2 (2009) ===
No. overall	No. in season	Title	Directed by	Written by	Original release date	U.S. viewers (millions)
8	1	"Seven Thirty-Seven"	Bryan Cranston	J. Roberts	March 8, 2009	1.66
9	2	"Grilled"	Charles Haid	George Mastras	March 15, 2009	1.60
10	3	"Bit by a Dead Bee"	Terry McDonough	Peter Gould	March 22, 2009	1.13
11	4	"Down"	John Dahl	Sam Catlin	March 29, 2009	1.29
12	5	"Breakage"	Johan Renck	Moira Walley-Beckett	April 5, 2009	1.21
13	6	"Peekaboo"	Peter Medak	J. Roberts & Vince Gilligan	April 12, 2009	1.41
14	7	"Negro y Azul"	Felix Alcala	John Shiban	April 19, 2009	1.20
15	8	"Better Call Saul"	Terry McDonough	Peter Gould	April 26, 2009	1.04
16	9	"4 Days Out"	Michelle MacLaren	Sam Catlin	May 3, 2009	1.27
17	10	"Over"	Phil Abraham	Moira Walley-Beckett	May 10, 2009	1.19
18	11	"Mandala"	Adam Bernstein	George Mastras	May 17, 2009	1.29
19	12	"Phoenix"	Colin Bucksey	John Shiban	May 24, 2009	1.19
20	13	"ABQ"	Adam Bernstein	Vince Gilligan	May 31, 2009	1.50

=== Season 3 (2010) ===
No. overall	No. in season	Title	Directed by	Written by	Original release date	U.S. viewers (millions)
21	1	"No Más"	Bryan Cranston	Vince Gilligan	March 21, 2010	1.95
22	2	"Caballo sin Nombre"	Adam Bernstein	Peter Gould	March 28, 2010	1.55
23	3	"I.F.T."	Michelle MacLaren	George Mastras	April 4, 2010	1.33
24	4	"Green Light"	Scott Winant	Sam Catlin	April 11, 2010	1.46
25	5	"Más"	Johan Renck	Moira Walley-Beckett	April 18, 2010	1.61
26	6	"Sunset"	John Shiban	John Shiban	April 25, 2010	1.64
27	7	"One Minute"	Michelle MacLaren	Thomas Schnauz	May 2, 2010	1.52
28	8	"I See You"	Colin Bucksey	Gennifer Hutchison	May 9, 2010	1.78
29	9	"Kafkaesque"	Michael Slovis	Peter Gould & George Mastras	May 16, 2010	1.61
30	10	"Fly"	Rian Johnson	Sam Catlin & Moira Walley-Beckett	May 23, 2010	1.20
31	11	"Abiquiu"	Michelle MacLaren	John Shiban & Thomas Schnauz	May 30, 2010	1.32
32	12	"Half Measures"	Adam Bernstein	Sam Catlin & Peter Gould	June 6, 2010	1.19
33	13	"Full Measure"	Vince Gilligan	Vince Gilligan	June 13, 2010	1.56

=== Season 4 (2011) ===
No. overall	No. in season	Title	Directed by	Written by	Original release date	U.S. viewers (millions)
34	1	"Box Cutter"	Adam Bernstein	Vince Gilligan	July 17, 2011	2.58
35	2	"Thirty-Eight Snub"	Michelle MacLaren	George Mastras	July 24, 2011	1.97
36	3	"Open House"	David Slade	Sam Catlin	July 31, 2011	1.71
37	4	"Bullet Points"	Colin Bucksey	Moira Walley-Beckett	August 7, 2011	1.83
38	5	"Shotgun"	Michelle MacLaren	Thomas Schnauz	August 14, 2011	1.75
39	6	"Cornered"	Michael Slovis	Gennifer Hutchison	August 21, 2011	1.67
40	7	"Problem Dog"	Peter Gould	Peter Gould	August 28, 2011	1.91
41	8	"Hermanos"	Johan Renck	Sam Catlin & George Mastras	September 4, 2011	1.98
42	9	"Bug"	Terry McDonough	Moira Walley-Beckett & Thomas Schnauz	September 11, 2011	1.89
43	10	"Salud"	Michelle MacLaren	Peter Gould & Gennifer Hutchison	September 18, 2011	1.80
44	11	"Crawl Space"	Scott Winant	George Mastras & Sam Catlin	September 25, 2011	1.55
45	12	"End Times"	Vince Gilligan	Thomas Schnauz & Moira Walley-Beckett	October 2, 2011	1.73
46	13	"Face Off"	Vince Gilligan	Vince Gilligan	October 9, 2011	1.90

=== Season 5 (2012–13) ===
No. overall	No. in season	Title	Directed by	Written by	Original release date	U.S. viewers (millions)
Part One
47	1	"Live Free or Die"	Michael Slovis	Vince Gilligan	July 15, 2012	2.93
48	2	"Madrigal"	Michelle MacLaren	Vince Gilligan	July 22, 2012	2.29
49	3	"Hazard Pay"	Adam Bernstein	Peter Gould	July 29, 2012	2.20
50	4	"Fifty-One"	Rian Johnson	Sam Catlin	August 5, 2012	2.29
51	5	"Dead Freight"	George Mastras	George Mastras	August 12, 2012	2.48
52	6	"Buyout"	Colin Bucksey	Gennifer Hutchison	August 19, 2012	2.81
53	7	"Say My Name"	Thomas Schnauz	Thomas Schnauz	August 26, 2012	2.98
54	8	"Gliding Over All"	Michelle MacLaren	Moira Walley-Beckett	September 2, 2012	2.78
Part Two
55	9	"Blood Money"	Bryan Cranston	Peter Gould	August 11, 2013	5.92
56	10	"Buried"	Michelle MacLaren	Thomas Schnauz	August 18, 2013	4.77
57	11	"Confessions"	Michael Slovis	Gennifer Hutchison	August 25, 2013	4.85
58	12	"Rabid Dog"	Sam Catlin	Sam Catlin	September 1, 2013	4.41
59	13	"To'hajiilee"	Michelle MacLaren	George Mastras	September 8, 2013	5.11
60	14	"Ozymandias"	Rian Johnson	Moira Walley-Beckett	September 15, 2013	6.37
61	15	"Granite State"	Peter Gould	Peter Gould	September 22, 2013	6.58
62	16	"Felina"	Vince Gilligan	Vince Gilligan	September 29, 2013	10.28

== Film ==
=== El Camino: A Breaking Bad Movie (2019) ===
El Camino: A Breaking Bad Movie is a film written and directed by series creator Vince Gilligan that serves as a continuation of the television series. It was released on October 11, 2019, on Netflix and was broadcast on AMC on February 16, 2020. The film centers around Jesse Pinkman, and takes place both during his captivity at the hands of the Aryan Brotherhood and after his escape in the Breaking Bad series finale.

Title	Directed by	Written by	Original release date	U.S. viewers (millions)
El Camino: A Breaking Bad Movie	Vince Gilligan	Vince Gilligan	October 11, 2019	2.65 (Note: 2.65 million viewers on the first day of release and 6.54 million over the first three days.)

== Other media ==
=== Breaking Bad: Original Minisodes (2009–2011) ===
Breaking Bad: Original Minisodes is a web series based on the television series Breaking Bad. A total of 17 "minisodes", which are more comedy-oriented than most full episodes, were released over the course of three years.

==== Season 1 (2009) ====
On February 17, 2009, five "mini-episodes" were made available online before the premiere of the show's second season. These five were eventually included with Breaking Bad: The Complete Second Season.

No. overall	No. in season	Title	Directed by	Written by	Original release date	Running time
1	1	"Good Cop / Bad Cop"	John Shiban	Suzanne Potts	February 17, 2009	2:53
Hank and Marie celebrate Valentine's Day.
2	2	"Wedding Day"	John Shiban	Kate Powers	February 17, 2009	4:50
Hank and Walt have a discussion on Hank and Marie's wedding day.
3	3	"TwaüghtHammër"	John Shiban	Gennifer Hutchison	February 17, 2009	4:13
Jesse explains the origins of his band, TwaüghtHammër.
4	4	"Marie's Confession"	John Shiban	Vince Gilligan	February 17, 2009	2:47
Marie confesses about her shop-lifting.
5	5	"The Break-In"	John Shiban	Gennifer Hutchison	February 17, 2009	4:49
Walt asks for help from Badger to break into an old woman's house and get his vacuum cleaner back.

==== Season 2 (2010) ====
Before Breaking Bad's third season, ten more webisodes were released, each mostly focused on Saul Goodman.

No. overall	No. in season	Title	Directed by	Written by	Original release date	Running time
6	1	"Live Saul Cam"	N/A	N/A	2010	5:05
Surveillance camera footage showcasing what Saul does in his free time at his office, including receiving fellatio from a prostitute.
7	2	"Fernando"	Peter Gould	Peter Gould	2010	1:19
Fernando, accused of stealing a truck, appears in an advert for Saul.
8	3	"Carl"	Peter Gould	Peter Gould	2010	1:23
Carl's story about how Saul helped him with a problem involving his ex.
9	4	"Wendy"	Peter Gould	Peter Gould	2010	1:28
Wendy's story about how Saul got her out of jail.
10	5	"Badger"	Peter Gould	Peter Gould	2010	1:56
Badger recalls how Saul got him out of trouble after he was selling meth.
11	6	"Wayfarer 515"	Peter Gould	Peter Gould	2010	2:14
The advert that Saul used to appeal to victims of the Wayfarer 515 accident.
12	7	"Letters to Saul"	Bob Odenkirk	Peter Gould	2010	1:52
Saul opens some letters that he receives from criminals.
13	8	"Tiger Trouble? Better Call Saul!"	Peter Gould	Peter Gould	2010	1:50
An advert Saul used to appeal to illegal tiger owners.
14	9	"Saul Says: "Sue 'Em Now""	Bob Odenkirk	Peter Gould	2010	1:37
An advert that Saul used to make people want to come to him to sue companies.
15	10	"Team S.C.I.E.N.C.E."	N/A	N/A	2010	3:51
Jesse imagines all of his friends as one team, Team SCIENCE.

==== Season 3 (2011) ====
Additional minisodes were produced before the premiere of Breaking Bad's fourth season; two would eventually be released.

No. overall	No. in season	Title	Written by	Original release date	Running time
16	1	"Fatty Fat Fat"	Aubrey Husar & Gordon Smith	2011	0:57
Saul appears in an advert which appeals to overweight people to come to him for advice on how to lose weight.
17	2	"Fighting for You"	Aubrey Husar & Gordon Smith	2011	1:09
Saul's story about how two boxers came to him for compensation.

=== Snow Globe: A Breaking Bad Short (2020) ===
In conjunction with the television premiere of El Camino: A Breaking Bad Movie on AMC, the network released a three-minute short film Snow Globe: A Breaking Bad Short on its official YouTube account on February 17, 2020.

Title	Directed by	Written by	Original release date	Running time
Snow Globe: A Breaking Bad Short	Eric Schmidt	Melissa Ng	February 17, 2020	2:45
Todd assembles a custom snow globe which includes his and Lydia's likenesses, as he tries to call her to ask her on a date.

== Ratings ==
Breaking Bad : U.S. viewers per episode (millions)

Season	Episode number													Average
Season	1	2	3	4	5	6	7	8	9	10	11	12	13	Average
1	1.41	1.49	1.08	1.09	0.97	1.07	1.50	–						1.23
2	1.66	1.60	1.13	1.29	1.21	1.41	1.20	1.04	1.27	1.19	1.29	1.19	1.50	1.30
3	1.95	1.55	1.33	1.46	1.61	1.64	1.52	1.78	1.61	1.20	1.32	1.19	1.56	1.52
4	2.58	1.97	1.71	1.83	1.75	1.67	1.91	1.98	1.89	1.80	1.55	1.73	1.90	1.87
5A	2.93	2.29	2.20	2.29	2.48	2.81	2.98	2.78	–					2.60
5B	5.92	4.77	4.85	4.41	5.11	6.37	6.58	10.28	–					6.04

Audience measurement performed by Nielsen Media Research

== See also ==
- List of Better Call Saul episodes
