= List of awards and nominations received by Vince Gilligan =

Vince Gilligan awards and nominations
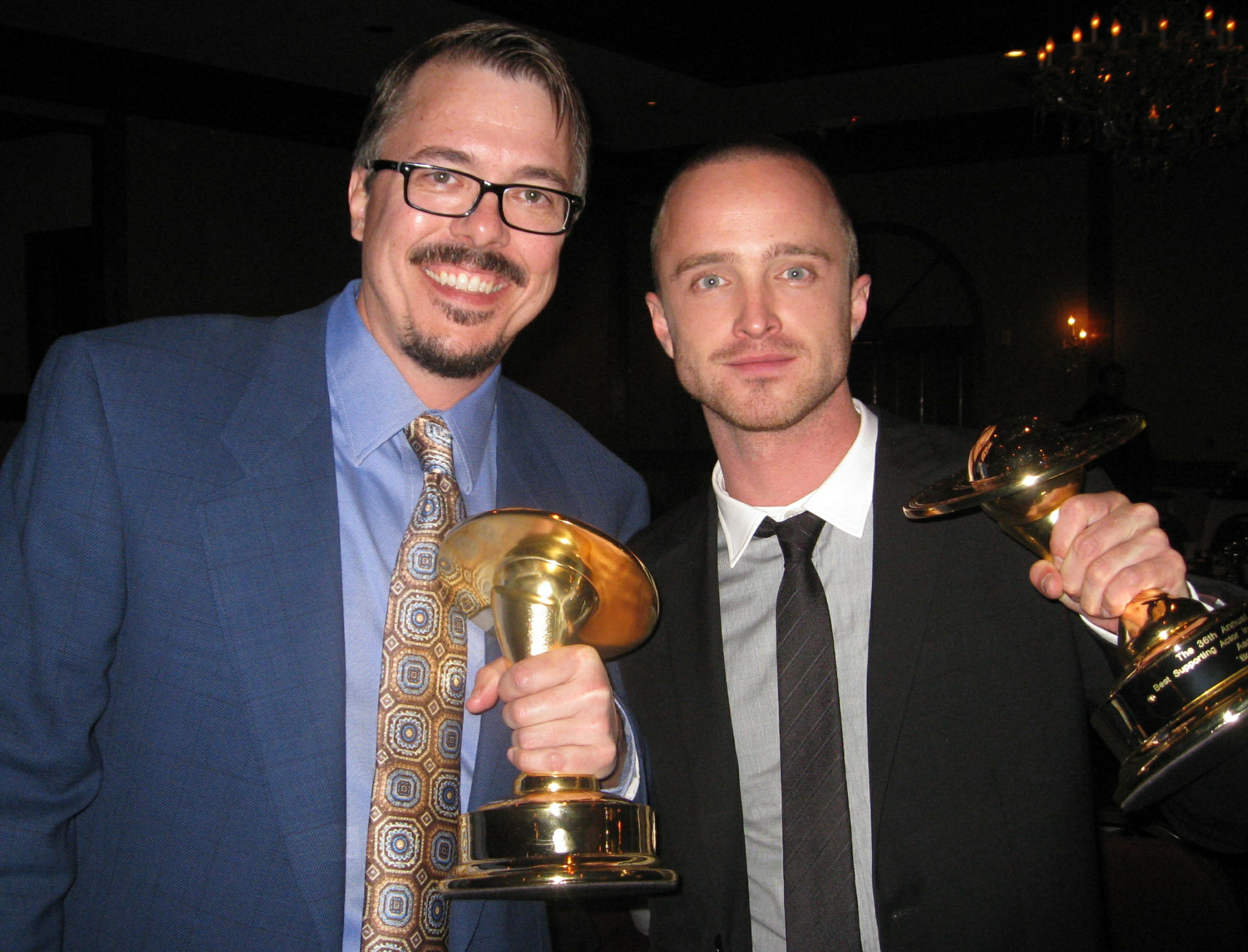
- Gilligan and Aaron Paul at the 2010 Saturn Awards
Awards and nominations
Award	Wins	Nominations
British Academy Television Awards	1	2
Directors Guild of America Awards	1	5
Golden Globes	1	4
Primetime Emmy Awards	5	26
Producers Guild of America Awards	2	13
Writers Guild of America Awards	7	20

Totals (Note: Certain award groups do not simply award one winner. They acknowledge several different recipients, have runners-up, and have third place. Since this is a specific recognition and is different from losing an award, runner-up mentions are considered wins in this award tally. For simplification and to avoid errors, each award in this list has been presumed to have had a prior nomination.)
- Wins: 23
- Nominations: 78

Vince Gilligan is an American director, producer, and screenwriter who has received various awards and nominations, including one British Academy Television Award, one Directors Guild of America Award, one Golden Globe Award, five Primetime Emmy Awards, two Producers Guild of America Awards, and seven Writers Guild of America Awards (including the honorary Laurel Award for TV Writing Achievement).

Gilligan received his first three Primetime Emmy Award nominations for his work as a producer and screenwriter on the fourth and fifth seasons of the science fiction drama television series The X-Files (1993–2002). He rose to prominence with AMC's crime drama television series Breaking Bad (2008–2013), which he created, directed, produced and wrote. The series' five seasons received universal acclaim, with critics lauding it as one of the greatest television series of all time. Breaking Bad earned Gilligan a total of nine Primetime Emmy Award nominations, winning two consecutive awards for Outstanding Drama Series for the show's two-part final season. The series also earned him a BAFTA TV Award for Best International Programme, a Golden Globe Award for Best Television Series – Drama, two Producers Guild of America Awards for Best Episodic Drama, a Directors Guild of America Award for Outstanding Directing in a Drama Series for the final episode "Felina", and five Writers Guild of America Awards in the categories Best Dramatic Series and Best Episodic Drama.

In 2015, Gilligan developed a Breaking Bad spin-off centered around the character of Saul Goodman (Bob Odenkirk), titled Better Call Saul (2015–2022). It earned him ten Primetime Emmy Award nominations, winning two awards for Outstanding Short Form Comedy or Drama Series for the two short form web series Employee Training with Gus Fring (2017) and Ethics Training with Kim Wexler (2020). In 2019, he wrote and directed the film El Camino: A Breaking Bad Movie, that serves as a sequel and epilogue to Breaking Bad, continuing the story of Jesse Pinkman (Aaron Paul). The film was nominated for the Primetime Emmy Award for Outstanding Television Movie, while Gilligan received his third Directors Guild of America Award nomination.

In 2025, Gilligan's post-apocalyptic science fiction television series Pluribus (2025–present) premiered on Apple TV. It has earned him further nominations at the BAFTA TV Awards, Golden Globes, and Writers Guild of America Awards, while he received his fifth Emmy Award, Outstanding Writing for a Drama Series for the premiere episode "We Is Us".

== Awards and nominations ==
Awards and nominations received by Vince Gilligan
Award	Year	Work	Category	Result	Ref.
American Cinema Editors Awards	2018	—N/a	ACE Golden Eddie Filmmaker of the Year Award	Won	
British Academy Television Awards	2014	Breaking Bad (season 5, part II)	Best International Programme (Note: shared with Mark Johnson, George Mastras, and Sam Catlin)	Won	
British Academy Television Awards	2026	Pluribus (season 1)	Best International Programme (Note: shared with the production team)	Nominated	
Directors Guild of America Awards	2012	Breaking Bad (episode: "Face Off")	Outstanding Directorial Achievement in Dramatic Series	Nominated	
Directors Guild of America Awards	2014	Breaking Bad (episode: "Felina")	Outstanding Directorial Achievement in Dramatic Series	Won	
Directors Guild of America Awards	2020	El Camino: A Breaking Bad Movie	Outstanding Directorial Achievement in Movies for Television and Limited Series	Nominated	
Directors Guild of America Awards	2021	Better Call Saul (episode: "Bagman")	Outstanding Directorial Achievement in Dramatic Series	Nominated	
Directors Guild of America Awards	2023	Better Call Saul (episode: "Waterworks")	Outstanding Directorial Achievement in Dramatic Series	Nominated	
Edgar Awards	2011	Breaking Bad (episode: "Full Measure")	Best Television Episode Teleplay	Nominated	
Edgar Awards	2011	Breaking Bad (episode: "No Más")	Best Television Episode Teleplay	Nominated	
Golden Globes	2013	Breaking Bad (season 5, part I)	Best Television Series – Drama (Note: The Best Television Awards for the Television Series – Musical or Comedy, Television Series – Drama, Limited Series and Motion Picture Made for Television categories are given to the individual producers accredited by the Producers Guild of America for those television programs.)	Nominated	
Golden Globes	2014	Breaking Bad (season 5, part II)	Best Television Series – Drama	Won	
Golden Globes	2023	Better Call Saul (season 6)	Best Television Series – Drama	Nominated	
Golden Globes	2026	Pluribus (season 1)	Best Television Series – Drama	Nominated	
Gotham TV Awards	2026	Pluribus (season 1)	Breakthrough Drama Series (Note: shared with Jeff Frost, Diane Mercer, Allyce Ozarski, Gordon Smith, and Alison Tatlock)	Won	
Hugo Awards	2026	Pluribus (episode: "We Is Us")	Best Dramatic Presentation – Short Form	Nominated	
Humanitas Prize	2011	Breaking Bad (episode: "Peekaboo")	60 Minute Network or Syndicated Television (Note: shared with J. Roberts)	Nominated	
Location Managers Guild Awards	2026	—N/a	Eva Monley Award	Won	
Primetime Emmy Awards	1997	The X-Files (season 4)	Outstanding Drama Series (Note: shared with executive producers Chris Carter, R.W. Goodwin, and Howard Gordon; consulting producers Ken Horton, Glen Morgan, and James Wong; co-producers Paul Rabwin and Frank Spotnitz; associate producer Lori Jo Nemhauser; producers Rob Bowman, Joseph Patrick Finn, and Kim Manners)	Nominated	
Primetime Emmy Awards	1997	The X-Files (episode: "Memento Mori")	Outstanding Writing for a Drama Series (Note: shared with Chris Carter, John Shiban, and Frank Spotnitz)	Nominated	
Primetime Emmy Awards	1998	The X-Files (season 5)	Outstanding Drama Series (Note: shared with executive producers Chris Carter, R.W. Goodwin, Paul Rabwin, and John Shiban; co-executive producer Frank Spotnitz; consulting producer Ken Horton; co-producer Lori Jo Nemhauser; producers Rob Bowman, Joseph Patrick Finn, and Kim Manners)	Nominated	
Primetime Emmy Awards	2008	Breaking Bad (episode: "Pilot")	Outstanding Directing for a Drama Series	Nominated	
Primetime Emmy Awards	2009	Breaking Bad (season 2)	Outstanding Drama Series (Note: shared with executive producer Mark Johnson; producers Melissa Bernstein, Stewart A. Lyons, and Karen Moore)	Nominated	
Primetime Emmy Awards	2010	Breaking Bad (season 3)	Outstanding Drama Series (Note: shared with executive producer Mark Johnson; co-executive producer Michelle MacLaren; supervising producer Sam Catlin; producers Melissa Bernstein, Peter Gould, Stewart A. Lyons, George Mastras, and Thomas Schnauz)	Nominated	
Primetime Emmy Awards	2012	Breaking Bad (season 4)	Outstanding Drama Series (Note: shared with executive producers Mark Johnson and Michelle MacLaren; co-executive producers Melissa Bernstein and Sam Catlin; supervising producers Peter Gould, George Mastras, and Thomas Schnauz; producers Moira Walley-Beckett, Bryan Cranston, Stewart A. Lyons, and Diane Mercer)	Nominated	
Primetime Emmy Awards	2012	Breaking Bad (episode: "Face Off")	Outstanding Directing for a Drama Series	Nominated	
Primetime Emmy Awards	2013	Breaking Bad (season 5, part I)	Outstanding Drama Series (Note: shared with executive producers Mark Johnson and Michelle MacLaren; co-executive producers Melissa Bernstein, Sam Catlin, Peter Gould, George Mastras, and Thomas Schnauz; supervising producer Moira Walley-Beckett; producers Bryan Cranston, Stewart A. Lyons, and Diane Mercer)	Won	
Primetime Emmy Awards	2014	Breaking Bad (season 5, part II)	Outstanding Drama Series (Note: shared with executive producers Mark Johnson and Michelle MacLaren; co-executive producers Melissa Bernstein, Sam Catlin, Peter Gould, George Mastras, Thomas Schnauz, and Moira Walley-Beckett; producers Bryan Cranston, Stewart A. Lyons, and Diane Mercer)	Won	
Primetime Emmy Awards	2014	Breaking Bad (episode: "Felina")	Outstanding Directing for a Drama Series	Nominated	
Primetime Emmy Awards	2014	Breaking Bad (episode: "Felina")	Outstanding Writing for a Drama Series	Nominated	
Primetime Emmy Awards	2015	Better Call Saul (season 1)	Outstanding Drama Series (Note: shared with executive producers Melissa Bernstein, Peter Gould, and Mark Johnson; co-executive producers Stewart A. Lyons and Thomas Schnauz; supervising producer Gennifer Hutchison; producers Nina Jack, Diane Mercer, and Bob Odenkirk)	Nominated	
Primetime Emmy Awards	2016	Better Call Saul (season 2)	Outstanding Drama Series (Note: shared with executive producers Melissa Bernstein, Peter Gould, Mark Johnson, and Thomas Schnauz; co-executive producer Gennifer Hutchison; supervising producer Nina Jack; producers Diane Mercer, Bob Odenkirk, and Robin Sweet)	Nominated	
Primetime Emmy Awards	2017	Better Call Saul (season 3)	Outstanding Drama Series (Note: shared with executive producers Melissa Bernstein, Peter Gould, Gennifer Hutchison, Mark Johnson, and Thomas Schnauz; co-executive producers Nina Jack and Diane Mercer; producers Jonathan Glatzer, Bob Odenkirk, Gordon Smith, and Robin Sweet)	Nominated	
Primetime Emmy Awards	2017	Better Call Saul (episode: "Witness")	Outstanding Directing for a Drama Series	Nominated	
Primetime Emmy Awards	2017	Better Call Saul Employee Training: Los Pollos Hermanos Employee Training	Outstanding Short Form Comedy or Drama Series (Note: shared with executive producers Dan Appel, Melissa Bernstein, Peter Gould, and Ariel Levine; producer Rob Knox)	Won	
Primetime Emmy Awards	2019	Better Call Saul (season 4)	Outstanding Drama Series (Note: shared with executive producers Melissa Bernstein, Peter Gould, Gennifer Hutchison, Mark Johnson, and Thomas Schnauz; co-executive producers Nina Jack and Diane Mercer; supervising producers Gordon Smith and Alison Tatlock; producers Ann Cherkis, Bob Odenkirk, and Robin Sweet)	Nominated	
Primetime Emmy Awards	2020	Better Call Saul (season 5)	Outstanding Drama Series (Note: shared with executive producers Melissa Bernstein, Peter Gould, Mark Johnson, and Thomas Schnauz; co-executive producers Diane Mercer, Gordon Smith, and Alison Tatlock; supervising producer Ann Cherkis; producers Princess Nash and Bob Odenkirk)	Nominated	
Primetime Emmy Awards	2020	El Camino: A Breaking Bad Movie	Outstanding Television Movie (Note: shared with executive producer Diane Mercer; producers Melissa Bernstein, Mark Johnson, Charles Newirth, and Aaron Paul)	Nominated	
Primetime Emmy Awards	2020	Better Call Saul Employee Training: Legal Ethics with Kim Wexler	Outstanding Short Form Comedy or Drama Series (Note: shared with executive producers Dan Appel, Melissa Bernstein, Peter Gould, and Ariel Levine; producer James Heth)	Won	
Primetime Emmy Awards	2022	Better Call Saul (season 6, part I)	Outstanding Drama Series (Note: shared with executive producers Melissa Bernstein, Peter Gould, Mark Johnson, Diane Mercer, Michael Morris, Thomas Schnauz, Gordon Smith, and Alison Tatlock; co-executive producer Ann Cherkis; supervising producer Trina Siopy; producers Jenn Carroll, Bob Odenkirk, and Jim Powers)	Nominated	
Primetime Emmy Awards	2023	Better Call Saul (season 6, part II)	Outstanding Drama Series	Nominated	
Primetime Emmy Awards	2026	Pluribus (season 1)	Outstanding Drama Series (Note: shared with Jenn Carroll, Jeff Frost, Julie Hartley, Diane Mercer, Trina Siopy, Chris Smirnoff, Gordon Smith, and Alison Tatlock)	Nominated	
Primetime Emmy Awards	2026	Pluribus (episode "We Is Us")	Outstanding Directing for a Drama Series	Nominated	
Primetime Emmy Awards	2026	Pluribus (episode "We Is Us")	Outstanding Writing for a Drama Series	Won	
Producers Guild of America Awards	2010	Breaking Bad (season 2)	Outstanding Producer of Episodic Television, Drama (Note: shared with Melissa Bernstein, Mark Johnson, Stewart A. Lyons, and Karen Moore)	Nominated	
Producers Guild of America Awards	2011	Breaking Bad (season 3)	Outstanding Producer of Episodic Television, Drama (Note: shared with Melissa Bernstein, Mark Johnson, Stewart A. Lyons, and Michelle MacLaren)	Nominated	
Producers Guild of America Awards	2013	Breaking Bad (season 4)	Outstanding Producer of Episodic Television, Drama (Note: shared with Melissa Bernstein, Sam Catlin, Bryan Cranston, Peter Gould, Mark Johnson, Stewart A. Lyons, George Mastras, Diane Mercer, Thomas Schnauz, and Moira Walley-Beckett)	Nominated	
Producers Guild of America Awards	2014	Breaking Bad (season 5, part I)	Outstanding Producer of Episodic Television, Drama (Note: shared with Melissa Bernstein, Sam Catlin, Bryan Cranston, Peter Gould, Mark Johnson, Stewart A. Lyons, Michelle MacLaren, George Mastras, Diane Mercer, Thomas Schnauz, and Moira Walley-Beckett)	Won	
Producers Guild of America Awards	2015	Breaking Bad (season 5, part II)	Outstanding Producer of Episodic Television, Drama (Note: shared with Melissa Bernstein, Sam Catlin, Bryan Cranston, Peter Gould, Mark Johnson, Stewart A. Lyons, Michelle MacLaren, George Mastras, Diane Mercer, Thomas Schnauz, and Moira Walley-Beckett)	Won	
Producers Guild of America Awards	2016	Better Call Saul (season 1)	Outstanding Producer of Episodic Television, Drama (Note: shared with Melissa Bernstein, Peter Gould, Gennifer Hutchison, Nina Jack, Mark Johnson, Stewart A. Lyons, Diane Mercer, Bob Odenkirk, and Thomas Schnauz)	Nominated	
Producers Guild of America Awards	2017	Better Call Saul (season 2)	Outstanding Producer of Episodic Television, Drama (Note: shared with Melissa Bernstein, Peter Gould, Gennifer Hutchison, Nina Jack, Mark Johnson, Diane Mercer, Bob Odenkirk, Thomas Schnauz, and Robin Sweet)	Nominated	
Producers Guild of America Awards	2019	Better Call Saul (season 4)	Outstanding Producer of Episodic Television, Drama (Note: shared with Melissa Bernstein, Ann Cherkis, Peter Gould, Gennifer Hutchison, Nina Jack, Mark Johnson, Diane Mercer, Bob Odenkirk, Thomas Schnauz, Gordon Smith, Robin Sweet, and Alison Tatlock)	Nominated	
Producers Guild of America Awards	2020	El Camino: A Breaking Bad Movie	Outstanding Producer of Streamed or Televised Movies (Note: shared with Melissa Bernstein, Mark Johnson, Diane Mercer, Charles Newirth, and Aaron Paul)	Nominated	
Producers Guild of America Awards	2021	Better Call Saul (season 5)	Outstanding Producer of Episodic Television, Drama (Note: shared with Melissa Bernstein, Ann Cherkis, Peter Gould, Mark Johnson, Diane Mercer, Princess Nash, Bob Odenkirk, Thomas Schnauz, Gordon Smith, and Alison Tatlock)	Nominated	
Producers Guild of America Awards	2023	Better Call Saul (season 6)	Outstanding Producer of Episodic Television, Drama (Note: shared with Melissa Bernstein, Jenn Carroll, Ann Cherkis, Peter Gould, Mark Johnson, Diane Mercer, Michael Morris, Bob Odenkirk, James Powers, Thomas Schnauz, Trina Siopy, Gordon Smith, and Alison Tatlock)	Nominated	
Producers Guild of America Awards	2023	Better Call Saul: Filmmaker Training	Outstanding Short-Form Program	Nominated	
Producers Guild of America Awards	2026	Pluribus (season 1)	Outstanding Producer of Episodic Television, Drama (Note: shared with Jenn Carroll, Jeff Frost, Julie Hartley, Diane Mercer, Allyce Ozarski, Trina Siopy, Chris Smirnoff, Gordon Smith, and Alison Tatlock)	Nominated	
Saturn Awards	2013	—N/a	Dan Curtis Legacy Award	Won	
Seoul International Drama Awards	2026	Pluribus (season 1)	Best Director (Note: shared with Gordon Smith)	Won	
Seoul International Drama Awards	2026	Pluribus (season 1)	Best Screenwriter	Nominated	
Writers Guild of America Awards	2009	Breaking Bad (season 1)	Best New Series (Note: shared with Peter Gould, Patty Lin, George Mastras, and J. Roberts)	Nominated	
Writers Guild of America Awards	2009	Breaking Bad (episode: "Pilot")	Best Episodic Drama	Won	
Writers Guild of America Awards	2010	Breaking Bad (season 2)	Best Dramatic Series (Note: shared with Sam Catlin, Peter Gould, George Mastras, J. Roberts, John Shiban, and Moira Walley-Beckett)	Nominated	
Writers Guild of America Awards	2011	Breaking Bad (season 3)	Best Dramatic Series (Note: shared with Sam Catlin, Peter Gould, Gennifer Hutchison, George Mastras, Thomas Schnauz, John Shiban, and Moira Walley-Beckett)	Nominated	
Writers Guild of America Awards	2012	Breaking Bad (season 4)	Best Dramatic Series	Won	
Writers Guild of America Awards	2012	Breaking Bad (episode: "Box Cutter")	Best Episodic Drama (Note: tied with Henry Bromell for "The Good Soldier" from Homeland)	Won	
Writers Guild of America Awards	2013	Breaking Bad (season 5, part I)	Best Dramatic Series (Note: shared with Sam Catlin, Peter Gould, Gennifer Hutchison, George Mastras, Thomas Schnauz, and Moira Walley-Beckett)	Won	
Writers Guild of America Awards	2014	Breaking Bad (season 5, part II)	Best Dramatic Series	Won	
Writers Guild of America Awards	2016	Better Call Saul (season 1)	Best Dramatic Series (Note: shared with Peter Gould, Gennifer Hutchison, Bradley Paul, Thomas Schnauz, and Gordon Smith)	Nominated	
Writers Guild of America Awards	2016	Better Call Saul (season 1)	Best New Series	Nominated	
Writers Guild of America Awards	2016	Better Call Saul (episode: "Uno")	Best Episodic Drama (Note: shared with Peter Gould)	Won	
Writers Guild of America Awards	2017	Better Call Saul (season 2)	Best Dramatic Series (Note: shared with Ann Cherkis, Jonathan Glatzer, Peter Gould, Gennifer Hutchison, Heather Marion, Thomas Schnauz, and Gordon Smith)	Nominated	
Writers Guild of America Awards	2017	Better Call Saul (episode: "Klick")	Best Episodic Drama (Note: shared with Heather Marion)	Nominated	
Writers Guild of America Awards	2018	Better Call Saul (season 3)	Best Dramatic Series	Nominated	
Writers Guild of America Awards	2019	Better Call Saul (season 4)	Best Dramatic Series (Note: shared with Ann Cherkis, Peter Gould, Gennifer Hutchison, Heather Marion, Thomas Schnauz, Gordon Smith, and Alison Tatlock)	Nominated	
Writers Guild of America Awards	2020	El Camino: A Breaking Bad Movie	Best Long Form Television – Adapted	Nominated	
Writers Guild of America Awards	2021	Better Call Saul (season 5)	Best Dramatic Series (Note: shared with Ann Cherkis, Peter Gould, Ariel Levine, Heather Marion, Thomas Schnauz, Gordon Smith, and Alison Tatlock)	Nominated	
Writers Guild of America Awards	2023	Better Call Saul (season 6)	Best Dramatic Series (Note: shared with Ann Cherkis, Peter Gould, Ariel Levine, Thomas Schnauz, Gordon Smith, and Alison Tatlock)	Nominated	
Writers Guild of America Awards	2025	—N/a	Laurel Award for TV Writing Achievement	Won	
Writers Guild of America Awards	2026	Pluribus (season 1)	Best Dramatic Series (Note: shared with Vera Blasi, Jenn Carroll, Jonny Gomez, Peter Gould, Ariel Levine, Gordon Smith, and Alison Tatlock)	Nominated	
Writers Guild of America Awards	2026	Pluribus (season 1)	Best New Series	Nominated	

== See also ==
- List of accolades received by El Camino: A Breaking Bad Movie
- List of accolades received by The X-Files
- List of awards and nominations received by Better Call Saul
- List of awards and nominations received by Breaking Bad
