= Open House (Breaking Bad) =

- Breaking Bad episode
- Episode no.: Season 4 Episode 3
- Directed by: David Slade
- Written by: Sam Catlin
- Cinematography by: Michael Slovis
- Editing by: Skip Macdonald
- Original air date: July 31, 2011
- Running time: 46 minutes

Guest appearances
- Nigel Gibbs as Tim Roberts; Jennifer Hasty as Stephanie Doswell; Bill Burr as Patrick Kuby; Jeremy Howard as Sketchy; Marius Stan as Bogdan Wolynetz; Lavell Crawford as Huell Babineaux; Ray Campbell as Tyrus Kitt

Episode chronology
← Previous "Thirty-Eight Snub"	Next → "Bullet Points"
- Breaking Bad season 4

"Open House" is the third episode of the fourth season of the American television drama series Breaking Bad, and the 36th overall episode of the series. It originally aired on AMC in the United States on July 31, 2011. In the episode, Walter and Skyler advance their plans to buy a car wash as a front organization, while Jesse holds increasingly darker parties to distract from his guilt for having killed Gale. Meanwhile, Marie starts stealing to cope with the difficult recovery of her husband Hank, who is asked to offer his advice regarding Gale's murder investigation.

The episode was written by Sam Catlin and directed by filmmaker David Slade, marking his first time directing for television. It featured guest appearances by Nigel Gibbs and stand-up comedian Bill Burr, the latter of whom specifically sought to appear on the show. Marie's return to the kleptomania she demonstrated in the first season was conceived early during brainstorming sessions for the third season.

Breaking Bad music supervisor Thomas Golubić sought to select music for Jesse's party sequences appropriate for the dark tone of the scenes, including the song "If I Had a Heart" by Swedish musician Fever Ray. "Open House" was viewed by an estimated 1.714 million viewers and received a 0.7 Nielsen rating among adults between the ages of 18 and 49.

== Plot ==
While preparing for his next meth cook, Walter becomes furious after noticing a surveillance camera has been installed in the lab. Later that day, Skyler and Walt meet with Saul and Skyler convinces Walt to buy the car wash by mentioning how Bogdan insulted his manhood. She devises a plan to trick Bogdan into selling by having Saul's con artist acquaintance Patrick Kuby pretend to be a United States Environmental Protection Agency representative who is shutting down the business out of concern over contaminants. Bogdan begrudgingly sells to her, even agreeing to a lower price than her original offer.

Jesse is still feeling numb from recent events and attempts to clear his head with nostalgic go-kart trips. He continues to open his house for all-night drug-fueled orgies, and deliberately throws piles of money in the midst of the chaos. Tyrus Kitt surveils Jesse's house from a nearby car.

Frustrated by Hank's continuous cold shoulder towards her, Marie resumes her streak of kleptomania. After a series of thefts from real-estate open houses, during which she also makes up elaborate stories about her background, she is caught by a real estate agent who recognizes her from a previous incident. A livid Hank pulls strings with his friend Detective Tim Roberts to get her out of being charged. Roberts drops by the Schrader residence to seek Hank's help and gives him a photocopy of Gale's lab notebook. Hank initially shoves the notebook away but begins to read it later that night.

== Production ==
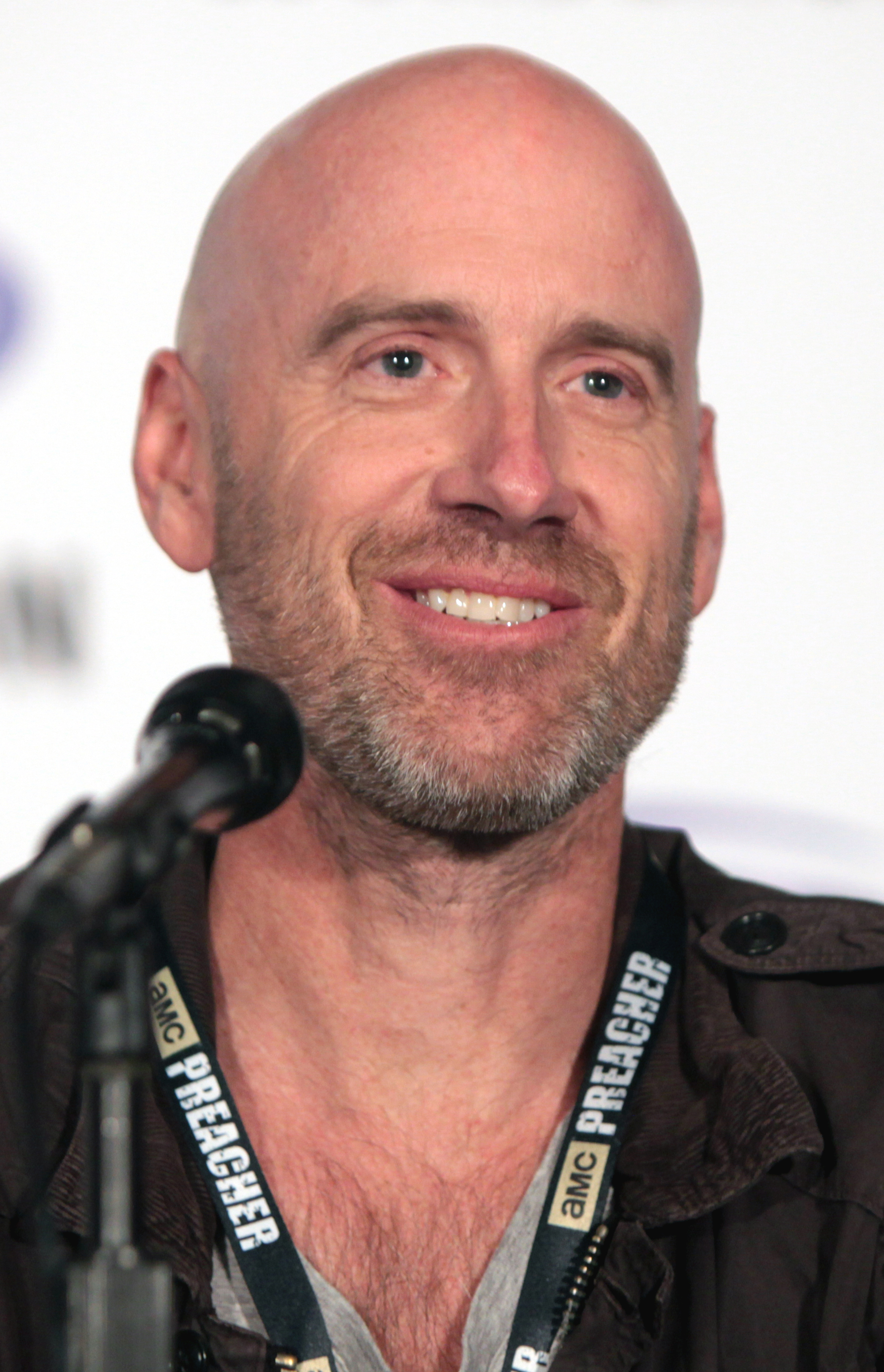
Sam Catlin wrote the episode.

"Open House" was written by Sam Catlin and directed by David Slade, marking his first time directing for television. Slade was a fan of Breaking Bad and sought to direct an episode of the show. Filmed in February 2011, the episode was edited by Skip Macdonald, one of a handful of editors who have regularly worked on the series. Nigel Gibbs reprised his role as detective Tim Roberts, whom he portrayed in the second season episode "Grilled". Stand-up comedian Bill Burr made a guest appearance as the man who poses as an environmental inspector for Skyler. Burr was cast after he expressed interest in appearing on the show to Breaking Bad extras casting directors Sharon Bialy and Sherry Thomas. Series creator Vince Gilligan said, "We just waste so much time here in the writer's room by getting on YouTube and watching some of his routines." Stand-up comedian Lavell Crawford reprised his recurring role as Huell, Saul's bodyguard, and Jennifer Hasty also made a guest appearance as Stephanie Doswell, the realtor who exposes Marie's thefts.

The concept of Gus installing a surveillance camera into the meth lab stemmed from the idea of Walter and Gus employing what Gilligan called "brinkmanship and gamesmanship" against each other after their falling out at the end of the third season. Gilligan commented: "What's one way Gus can amp up the story there? How can he mess with Walt's head a little bit?" The footage shown from the first-person perspective of the camera is actual footage from the real camera, including the numbers shown at the top and bottom of the screen. This is why that shot is shown in pillarbox and in lower quality than the rest of the episode, which was shot on 35 mm film. The episode features a subplot with Marie engaging in acts of kleptomania, which had been a major part of her character during the first season. Catlin said it was conceived early on that Marie would act this way while brainstorming the ideas for Marie coping with Hank's difficult recovery. Gilligan described Marie's acts of stealing as a respite for her: "She's looking for another life, but she's not actively ready to leave her husband or anything like that. ... We liked the quirkiness of it." Betsy Brandt said "Open House" was her favorite episode of the season to shoot.

The idea of Jesse riding go-karts by himself to relax was inspired by Aaron Paul and other crew members who often went kart racing between the filming of Breaking Bad episodes in Albuquerque, New Mexico. During one of the party scenes at Jesse's house, Jesse keeps throwing crumpled dollar bills at the mouth of a sleeping man wearing a dress shirt and tie with no pants until he finally gets one inside his mouth. Catlin thought of the idea, and it was property master Trina Siopy actually throwing the bills off-screen; she got one into the actor's mouth on her second try. The scenes in Jesse's house were shot on a set in a sound stage built by production designer Mark Freeborn and construction coordinator William Gilpin. Although scenes in Jesse's house are occasionally filmed in an actual house, these particular scenes could not be shot there because the party was so messy.

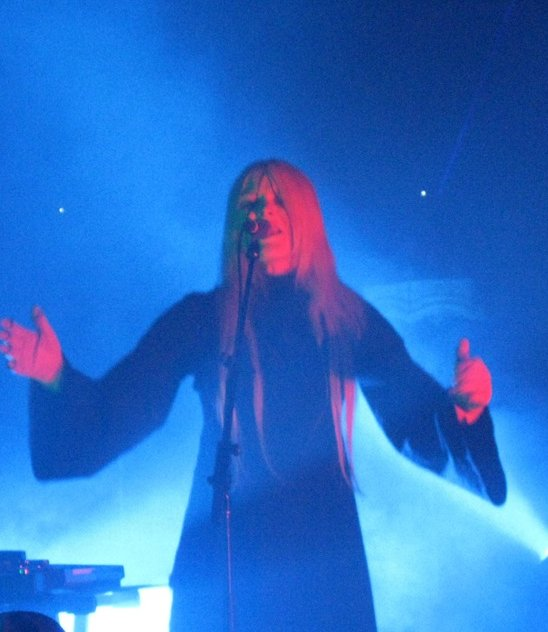
The song "If I Had a Heart" by Swedish artist Fever Ray (pictured) was featured in "Open House".

The party scenes sought to illustrate Jesse's internal guilt and self-hatred for having murdered Gale Boetticher in the third season finale, "Full Measure". Bryan Cranston praised these scenes, saying, "I thought it was a great way to show a person going through a private hell. That everybody suffers, deals with their own personal loss in many different ways." Although the previous episode, "Thirty-Eight Snub", also featured similar party scenes, the party was much darker and more decrepit in "Open House", and Breaking Bad music supervisor Thomas Golubić tried to select music appropriate for that darker tone. Originally he tried using variations of punk rock, hip hop and dubstep, but felt it was inappropriate and wanted something that delved "deeper into Jesse's headspace". He chose the song "If I Had a Heart" by Swedish musician Fever Ray which was used during a sequence of scenes before and during Jesse's party. Golubić said he liked the "muted loud sort of feel" of the song, which he felt matched Jesse's frame of mind and the "full, heavy darkness" of the party. It was chosen by a vote among the writers among four possible songs.

== Reception ==
=== Ratings ===
"Open House" aired on Sunday, July 31, 2011 on AMC. The episode was viewed by an estimated 1.714 million viewers and received a 0.7 Nielsen rating among adults between the ages of 18 and 49. This means that it was seen by 0.7% of all 18- to 49-year-olds watching television at the time of the broadcast. The episode was the 22nd highest-rated program on the day it aired.

=== Reviews ===
Alan Sepinwall of HitFix said he was particularly interested in the Marie and Jesse characters this episode, and called it a credit to the show's evolution that the supporting cast subplots can be so interesting without Walt. He also praised David Slade's direction, particularly during the jumpshots in Jesse's scenes. Seth Amitin of IGN called it a "great episode" and an improvement over the previous two, "Box Cutter" and "Thirty-Eight Snub". He praised the way Skyler's character proved herself to both Walter and Saul, and praised Betsy Brandt's performance, claiming her subplot provided much-needed comic relief and reminded him of the works of David Sedaris. Entertainment Weekly writer Melissa Maerz praised the development of Skyler's character and said the episode touched upon a common theme in Breaking Bad about masculinity. With Skyler asserting herself in Walter's work, and Hank taking out his insecurities about being disabled on Marie, Maerz said the script raises the question, "What does it mean to be a strong man?" Los Angeles Times writer Emily St. James called it "one of the best episodes this show has ever done", despite diverting the attention from Walter to the support cast members. St. James said the episode well demonstrated how Walter's actions affected others around him and said Marie's character was more interesting than in the past.

Matt Richenthal of TV Fanatic complimented the performances by Betsy Brandt and Aaron Paul, and said of the latter, "Seriously, does any actor on TV convey more by saying less than Aaron Paul?" He also compared Skyler's increasingly calculated approach to Walter's drug dealing to Gus' personality. New York magazine writer Logan Hill praised Brandt's performance and said it was interesting to see an episode so focused on Skyler and Marie on a show usually dominated by the male characters. However, he said Skyler's transformation from concerned wife to competent criminal partner felt too sudden. Not all reviews were positive. Slate writers June Thomas and Jessica Grose both enjoyed Marie in "Open House", but both felt the scenes at Jesse's house were too over-the-top and that Skyler's concerns about Walter's safety seemed out of character.

In 2019 The Ringer ranked "Open House" 50th out of the 62 total Breaking Bad episodes.
