= Bit by a Dead Bee =

- Breaking Bad episode
- Walter White in hospital with his family after feigning a fugue state
- Episode no.: Season 2 Episode 3
- Directed by: Terry McDonough
- Written by: Peter Gould
- Cinematography by: Michael Slovis
- Editing by: Skip Macdonald
- Original air date: March 22, 2009
- Running time: 47 minutes

Guest appearances
- Mark Margolis as Hector Salamanca; Harry Groener as Dr. Chavez; Michael Shamus Wiles as George Merkert; Matt Jones as Badger Mayhew; Tom Kiesche as Clovis; Steven Michael Quezada as Steven Gomez; David House as Dr. Delcavoli; Julia Minesci as Wendy; Todd Terry as SAC Ramey

Episode chronology
← Previous "Grilled"	Next → "Down"
- Breaking Bad season 2

"Bit by a Dead Bee" is the third episode of the second season of the American television crime drama series Breaking Bad and the 10th episode overall. It was written by Peter Gould and directed by Terry McDonough. The episode aired on AMC on March 22, 2009.

== Plot ==
Having gotten away from Tuco Salamanca, Walter White and Jesse Pinkman now have to get home and explain where they have been following their kidnapping. (Note: As depicted in "Seven Thirty-Seven".) Walt has a plan for both of them and they split up. Walt, pretending to be delirious, goes to a supermarket and takes off all of his clothes while walking through the aisles. He is hospitalized and claims to have no memory of where he has been for the last few days. The hospital is unable to find anything wrong with him, and Walt suggests that it was a combination of medication and chemotherapy that could have caused the episode. The hospital believes Walt is at risk for another fugue state and forces him to undergo a psychiatric evaluation. After receiving assurances regarding doctor-patient confidentiality, Walt tells the psychiatrist that he remembers everything and just wanted to get away for a while. They eventually agree to release him.

Jesse returns to his house to clean out the basement and get rid of the RV where he and Walt have been making methamphetamine. DEA agents locate Jesse and bring him in as a result of Hank Schrader having tracked Tuco and his uncle Hector while looking for Jesse in hopes of finding Walt. Having found evidence of Jesse having been at Tuco's house when Hank killed the latter, they question Jesse about his whereabouts. Jesse claims that he has been with a prostitute, Wendy, for the weekend, a false story backed up by the prostitute. The DEA does not believe Jesse and brings in Tuco's uncle Hector Salamanca to identify Jesse, but Hector shows his disdain for the DEA by refusing to expose Jesse, instead defecating in his wheelchair. With no evidence or witnesses, they let Jesse go. Jesse tries to contact his parents, but they refuse to help him. That night, Walt convinces Jesse to continue cooking meth. Later, Hank gets a present at the station: Tuco's teeth grill.

== Production ==
The episode was written by Peter Gould and directed by Terry McDonough. It aired on AMC in the United States and Canada on March 22, 2009.

== Critical reception ==
Donna Bowman, writing for The A.V. Club, gave it an A rating. Seth Amitin, writing for IGN, praised that the episode emphasized the "psychological impact that everything Pinkman and Walt have been through, for them, for their families". He gave the episode a 9.7/10.

In 2019, The Ringer ranked "Bit by a Dead Bee" 40th out of the 62 total Breaking Bad episodes. Vulture ranked it 39th overall.
