= ABQ (Breaking Bad) =

- Breaking Bad episode
- The introduction of Mike Ehrmantraut (Jonathan Banks) cleaning up the crime scene of Jane's death. His role in "ABQ" had been intended for Saul Goodman before scheduling conflicts prevented Bob Odenkirk from reprising his role.
- Episode no.: Season 2 Episode 13
- Directed by: Adam Bernstein
- Written by: Vince Gilligan
- Cinematography by: Michael Slovis
- Editing by: Lynne Willingham
- Original air date: May 31, 2009
- Running time: 47 minutes

Guest appearances
- Jonathan Banks as Mike Ehrmantraut; Giancarlo Esposito as Gus Fring; Krysten Ritter as Jane Margolis; John de Lancie as Donald Margolis; Steven Michael Quezada as Steve Gomez; Sam McMurray as Dr. Victor Bravenec; Michael Shamus Wiles as George Merkert; David House as Dr. Delcavoli

Episode chronology
← Previous "Phoenix"	Next → "No Más"
- Breaking Bad season 2

"ABQ" is the thirteenth and final episode of the second season of the American television crime drama series Breaking Bad. The episode aired on AMC on May 31, 2009.

This episode introduces cleaner and hitman Mike Ehrmantraut (Jonathan Banks). Along with Gus Fring and Saul Goodman, he was promoted to main cast in season three, and subsequently returned as a main character in the prequel Better Call Saul.

== Plot ==
Jesse Pinkman wakes from his heroin-induced sleep to find Jane Margolis dead, having choked on her own vomit. (Note: As depicted in "Phoenix".) He attempts CPR, to no avail, as she had already been dead several hours. Horrified and distraught, Jesse contacts Walter White. Walt calls Saul Goodman, who sends a cleaner, Mike Ehrmantraut, to remove evidence of drugs from Jesse's apartment. Jane's father Donald arrives at the apartment and discovers she has died. Jesse blames himself for Jane's death and runs off to a crack house. Walt locates an anguished Jesse and attempts to comfort him, before taking him to a rehab clinic.

Walt is preparing to undergo surgery to remove his cancer. The website that Walter Jr. made to bring in anonymous donations—in reality being used by Saul to launder Walt's drug money—garners media attention due to its apparent success; Walt is uncomfortable in the spotlight due to the pity shown him and his dislike of charitable donations. On the day of Walt's operation, as he is put under anesthesia, he groggily reveals the existence of a second cell phone he uses, making Skyler White suspicious of his activities. When Walt is released from the hospital, Skyler reveals that she has investigated his behavior over the past several months and found he has lied to her many times. Her discoveries include Gretchen never sending any money despite their medical bills nearly being paid and Walt not visiting his mother. (Note: As depicted in "4 Days Out".) Skyler then tells Walt he has to move out; Walt offers to tell her everything, but she is too afraid to know and drives away.

Five weeks later, Donald returns to his job as an air traffic controller despite still grieving Jane's death. While on the job, his mind wanders to Jane when a charter plane's callsign reminds him of Jane's initials, and he inadvertently allows another plane—Wayfarer Airlines Flight 515, a Boeing 737—to cross the charter plane's path. Sitting beside his swimming pool, Walt is startled by an explosion overhead. As he watches the mid-air collision in horror, a teddy bear lands in the pool. (Note: As depicted in the episode's opening teaser, as well as those for "Seven Thirty-Seven", "Down", and "Over".)

== Production ==
The episode was written by Vince Gilligan, and directed by Adam Bernstein. It aired on AMC in the United States and Canada on May 31, 2009. The plane crash at the end of the episode was inspired by Aeroméxico Flight 498 back in 1986 (as referenced above), in which the air-traffic controller who was directing air traffic at the time of the real-life accident shares the name of the lead character of Breaking Bad, Walter White.

This episode introduced the character of Mike as played by Jonathan Banks. The role of the cleaner to help Jesse prepare to deal with the police was originally meant to be handled by Saul Goodman, played by Bob Odenkirk. However, due to commitments to How I Met Your Mother, he was not available for filming of this episode, so Gilligan created Mike for that episode and into the next season as a cleaner.

== Critical reception ==
Donna Bowman, writing for The A.V. Club, commented that the episode "was horrific perfection".

In 2019, The Ringer ranked "ABQ" as the 28th best out of the 62 total Breaking Bad episodes. Vulture ranked it 35th overall.

For her work on this episode, Lynne Willingham won Outstanding Single-Camera Picture Editing for a Drama Series at the 61st Primetime Creative Arts Emmy Awards, while Michael Slovis was nominated for Outstanding Cinematography for a Single-Camera Series (One Hour).
