= Down (Breaking Bad) =

- Breaking Bad episode
- Skyler White smokes a cigarette while pregnant during the concluding scene
- Episode no.: Season 2 Episode 4
- Directed by: John Dahl
- Written by: Sam Catlin
- Cinematography by: Michael Slovis
- Editing by: Kelley Dixon
- Original air date: March 29, 2009
- Running time: 47 minutes

Guest appearances
- Tess Harper as Diane Pinkman; Michael Bofshever as Adam Pinkman; Dan Desmond as Mr. Gardiner; Tom Kiesche as Clovis; Caleb Jones as Louis Corbett

Episode chronology
← Previous "Bit by a Dead Bee"	Next → "Breakage"
- Breaking Bad season 2

"Down" is the fourth episode of the second season of the American television crime drama series Breaking Bad. It was written by Sam Catlin and directed by John Dahl. The episode aired on AMC on March 29, 2009.

== Plot ==
Walter White and Jesse Pinkman meet at a gas station to discuss their next move. Walt says he needs time to reassure his family after his "fugue state" (Note: As depicted in "Bit by a Dead Bee".) before he can cook again, and gives Jesse $600. The next morning, Walt cheerily makes breakfast, clearly disturbing Skyler White and Walter White Jr.; Skyler abruptly leaves the house and does not return until much later, not telling Walt where she has been. Meanwhile, Jesse meets with an attorney and his parents, who tell him that they found the meth lab in his basement and are evicting him from his aunt's house. They tell him he has 72 hours to leave, but the next morning Jesse's mother arrives with workmen who take everything in the house to storage. Jesse at first tries to convince his mother that he can change, then angrily tells her that he earned the house by taking care of his cancer-stricken aunt while his mother did nothing. She loses her temper and slaps him.

Afterwards, Jesse searches for a place to stay, but all of his friends turn him away. While Jesse is making a call at the gas station, his motorcycle and all his remaining possessions are stolen. Dejected, Jesse breaks into the lot where his RV is being kept, but accidentally falls through a Port-a-Potty, drenching himself in waste. He sleeps in his RV, only able to breathe through a gas mask. The next day, Clovis, the lot owner, finds him and demands the money he is owed, plus extra for repairs to the RV and the Port-a-Potty. Having no cash, Jesse begs for time to pay him back, but Clovis kicks him out. Jesse breaks back into the lot, steals his RV, and escapes by driving through the locked gate.

Hoping to reconnect with his son, Walt offers to give Walt Jr. a driving lesson while Skyler is out again. Walt Jr. shows his skill at driving, but Walt notices that he is using both feet to work the pedals due to his cerebral palsy. When Walt tries to get him to only use the right foot, Walt Jr. gets upset and accidentally hits a safety cone.

While Walt Jr. is at school, Walt tries to have a conversation with Skyler. He apologizes for how he has been acting lately, but Skyler is still convinced he is hiding something and storms out when he won't tell her what it is. Walt follows her out and sees the RV parked near his house. He confronts Jesse over making contact, and Jesse tells him he only wants his half of the money they've made and will disappear. Walt angrily states that he has done all the work while Jesse has done nothing, ranting that Jesse is a "pathetic junkie" who is too stupid to follow simple instructions. This causes Jesse to lose his temper and attack him, but he stops himself from killing Walt. Walt brings Jesse inside and gives him his half of the earnings, and then offers him breakfast. Meanwhile, back at the gas station, a pregnant Skyler gets into her car and takes out a cigarette and lighter. She hesitates, as she is silently judged by someone in a nearby car, but starts smoking.

== Production ==
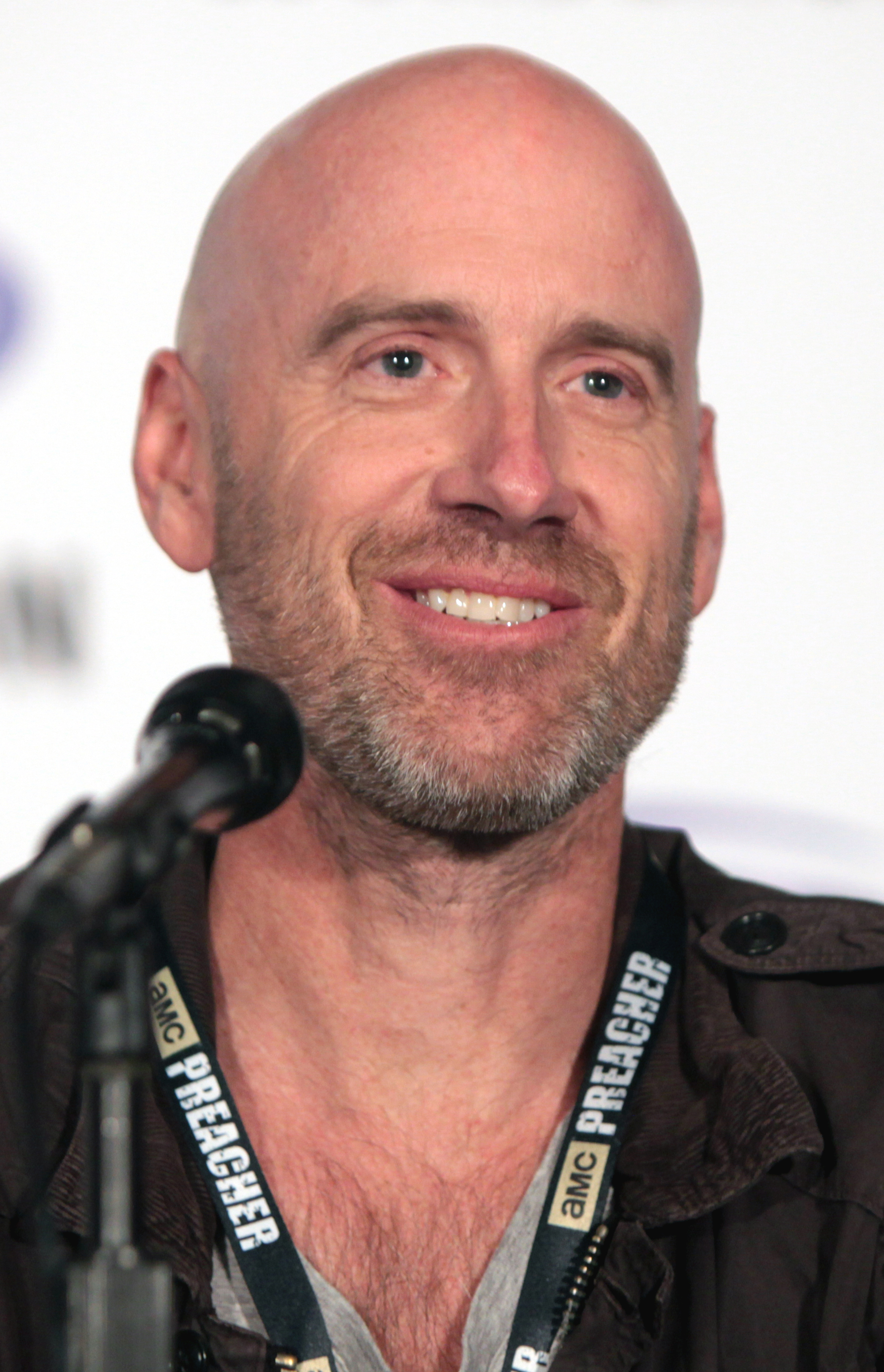
Sam Catlin wrote the episode.

The episode was written by Sam Catlin and directed by John Dahl. This was the only episode Dahl directed in the entire series. It aired on AMC in the United States and Canada on March 29, 2009.

The episode's title is in reference to a number of episodes foreshadowing an airplane crash that occurs later. Being second of the four episodes to feature a flashforward with the pink teddy bear in the pool seen in the first episode of the season, it would be placed second in the series of titles "Seven Thirty-Seven Down Over ABQ".

== Critical reception ==
Seth Amitin, writing for IGN, gave the episode an 8.9/10. Amitin praised Anna Gunn's performance. Donna Bowman, of The A.V. Club, gave the episode an A−.

In 2019, The Ringer ranked "Down" 53rd out of the 62 total Breaking Bad episodes. Vulture ranked it 55th overall.
