= Bullet Points =

Bullet Points can refer to:

- "Bullet Points" (Breaking Bad), a season four episode of Breaking Bad
- Bullet Points (comics), a comic book limited series

== See also ==
- Bullet points, a symbol used in lists of items
