= Bullet Points (Breaking Bad) =

- Breaking Bad episode
- Episode no.: Season 4 Episode 4
- Directed by: Colin Bucksey
- Written by: Moira Walley-Beckett
- Cinematography by: Michael Slovis
- Editing by: Kelley Dixon
- Original air date: August 7, 2011
- Running time: 45 minutes

Guest appearances
- David Costabile as Gale Boetticher; Jeremy Howard as Sketchy; Ray Campbell as Tyrus Kitt

Episode chronology
← Previous "Open House"	Next → "Shotgun"
- Breaking Bad season 4

"Bullet Points" is the fourth episode of the fourth season of the American television drama series Breaking Bad, and the 37th overall episode of the series. It originally aired on AMC in the United States on August 7, 2011.

== Plot ==
Mike Ehrmantraut is riding in the cargo compartment of a Los Pollos Hermanos refrigerator truck when it is forced off a rural road by a pair of hijackers. Mike listens as the gunmen kill the driver, then takes cover as they shoot up the cargo compartment. When the gunmen open the cargo doors, Mike immediately shoots and kills them. After he steps out of the truck, he finds that a bullet has grazed his right ear.

During a family dinner at Hank and Marie Schrader's, Walter and Skyler White tell everyone a story about Walter having a successful card counting method to explain how they can pay for Hank's medical bills and purchase the car wash. Under the guise of using the bathroom, Walt enters Hank's bedroom and finds the case file on Gale Boetticher's murder. Perusing quickly, he finds photos of Gale's body as well as a photocopy of Gale's notebook. Hank later tells Walt he is investigating Gale's murder and believes Gale was Heisenberg. When asked by Hank to read from Gale's notebook, Walt notices a line from a Walt Whitman poem and a dedication to "W. W." When Hank mentions the initials matching Walt's, Walt jokingly admits "you got me", before telling Hank that "W. W." refers to the poet.

Walt is disgusted by the condition of Jesse Pinkman's home, which is now being used as a crack house. Jesse admits he did not pick up the shell casing when he shot Gale, which could connect him to the shooting. Walt later laments to Saul Goodman that the meth business is falling apart because no one is acting professionally, and rejects an offer to go into hiding.

Jesse's complacency leads to all of his meth money being stolen, though he appears unbothered by the loss. Mike quickly recovers it and later tells Gus Fring that Jesse's lack of professionalism is a problem for the organization. Jesse does not appear at the lab the next day and Walt realizes he has been kidnapped. Mike drives Jesse to an unknown destination. When he asks Jesse if he would like to know where they are going, Jesse simply replies "nope."

== Production ==
"Bullet Points" was written by Moira Walley-Beckett and directed by Colin Bucksey, the third Breaking Bad episode he directed after "Phoenix" in season two and "I See You" in season three. During the cold open scene, one of Gus' drug-smuggling trucks is attacked by members of a Mexican drug cartel. This is a reference to what series creator Vince Gilligan refers to as a brewing "cold war" between Gus and the cartel due to Gus' actions against them during the third season. The scene in "Bullet Points" is the first reference to this storyline since the third-season finale "Full Measure", when Mike killed several cartel henchmen who had taken over one of Gus' chemical supply warehouses. To create the bullet holes that strike the truck Mike is hiding inside, the special effects department drilled, wired and hand-planted 380 squib explosives onto the truck, including 150 on each side of the vehicle and 80 for the back door. Two sets of the back door were used, one for the view of shots being fired at the exterior of the door and one for the view of the interior.

For the scene with Mike waiting inside the refrigeration truck, series creator Vince Gilligan wanted audiences to be able to see his breath so they would know how cold it was. To create that effect, the special effects crew designed a tiny plastic box with holes in it and placed dry ice inside, which Banks kept inside his mouth to create condensation when he exhaled. The idea was based on a similar device film director Frank Capra previously used with his actors in one of his films, which Gilligan read about in Capra's autobiography. The device worked, but had to be adjusted because it initially created an effect that looked more like cigarette smoke. Also for that scene, a bloody chunk of skin can be seen dangling from Mike's ear after he is shot. For that effect, special effects creators Greg Nicotero and Howard Berger, who are part of the company KNB Efx Group, made a mold of actor Jonathan Banks' ear and made an application for him to wear during filming. It was applied onto Banks by Breaking Bad make-up artists Corey Welk and Frieda Valenzuela.

David Costabile briefly reprised his role as Gale Boetticher. When Hank first reveals to Walter that he is investigating Gale's murder, he shows him a DVD of Gale singing karaoke with Thai subtitles. The idea was that Gale participated in a karaoke booth in Thailand and kept the DVD as a souvenir; Breaking Bad music supervisor Thomas Golubic specifically found someone who could translate the song lyrics into Thai for the video. A similar joke was featured in the HBO comedy series Flight of the Conchords, which also features Costabile in a supporting role. Gilligan said he was not aware of that joke at the time, but watched it after conceiving of the Gale joke and researching karaoke. He said of it: "It was freaking hilarious. It's brilliant. And then I was thinking, 'Oh shit, should we even do this now, because how can it be as good as those guys?'" Gale sings the Peter Schilling song "Major Tom (Coming Home)", which Gilligan chose because he felt it was appropriate for the character: "It felt right. It's a bit cheesy, it's earnest, but it also kind of sticks in your head and it's fun."

In the background of the karaoke performance, stock footage from the science-fiction television series Quark was visible in the background. Gilligan was a fan of the show during childhood and recognized it while reviewing available stock footage. The full karaoke video was made available on the official Breaking Bad website after the episode was first broadcast. The scene when Walter looks through Gale's notebook at Hank's behest features a montage of quick cuts between the notebook pages and Walter's face as he read. The montage was conceived by Gilligan, who wanted to express Walter's stress over reading the notebook to the viewers without overtly showing those emotions on Walter's face and arousing Hank's suspicion. It was difficult to shoot because the actors had to display these emotions without overtly expressing them, and the scene had to be reshot a second time as a result.

Jeremy Howard made a guest appearance in "Bullet Points" as Sketchy, a drug addict who speaks non-stop during scenes at Jesse's parties. Howard was acquainted with Bryan Cranston, who had cast him in an episode of the comedy series Malcolm in the Middle that Cranston directed. Howard was originally only slated to play Sketchy in the Breaking Bad episode "Open House", but Gilligan liked him so much he brought the character back for "Bullet Points". During one scene, Sketchy walks off-screen and accidentally knocks over several beer bottles, making a loud noise. The moment was accidental and unscripted, but the crew found it so funny they included it in the final cut of the episode. During a different scene at Jesse's party, Jesse buzzes the heads of several of his long-haired guests. MacLaren said it was difficult to find extras willing to have their heads shaved because those with long enough hair were so conscious of their hair that they did not want it cut. Several extras who signed up for the part dropped out before they finally found those willing to do it. Jesse also has his head buzzed, which was actor Aaron Paul's idea because he felt it was appropriate for the inner turmoil his character was experiencing.

== Reception ==
Seth Amitin of IGN awarded the episode an 8 out of 10 calling it "a solid building block for future story lines". Alan Sepinwall of HitFix gave the episode a positive review calling it "very oddly-structured, but never uninteresting". Matt Richenthal of TV Fanatic awarded the episode 4.9 out of 5 calling it "phenomenal". Donna Bowman reviewing for The A.V. Club gave the episode an "A−".

In 2019, The Ringer ranked "Bullet Points" 59th out of the 62 total Breaking Bad episodes.
