= Seven Thirty-Seven =

- Breaking Bad episode
- Tuco Salamanca holds both Walter White and Jesse Pinkman at gun point.
- Episode no.: Season 2 Episode 1
- Directed by: Bryan Cranston
- Written by: J. Roberts
- Cinematography by: Michael Slovis
- Editing by: Lynne Willingham
- Original air date: March 8, 2009
- Running time: 47 minutes

Guest appearances
- Raymond Cruz as Tuco Salamanca; Steven Michael Quezada as Steven Gomez; Cesar Garcia as No-Doze; Jesus Payan as Gonzo; Ryan Lee as Neighbor's Kid

Episode chronology
| ← Previous "A No-Rough-Stuff-Type Deal" | Next → "Grilled" |
- Breaking Bad season 2

"Seven Thirty-Seven" is the second season premiere episode of the American television drama series Breaking Bad, and the 8th episode overall. It was written by J. Roberts and directed by cast member Bryan Cranston who portrays the show's protagonist Walter White. The episode aired on AMC on March 8, 2009.

== Plot ==
After his purchase of meth from Walter White and Jesse Pinkman, (Note: As depicted in "A No-Rough-Stuff-Type Deal".) drug kingpin Tuco Salamanca viciously assaults his lieutenant, No-Doze, for speaking to Walt in Tuco’s place. After Tuco departs, Walt calculates the minimum amount of money he will need to provide for his family, concluding that the figure is $737,000. Tuco suddenly returns demanding that Walt save a convulsive No-Doze. Walter performs chest compressions on him to no avail, and No-Doze dies. Tuco tells Gonzo, the other man in his employ, to hide No-Doze's body, and Gonzo complies despite telling Tuco he should receive a Christian burial.

Walt parts ways with Jesse and goes home. Skyler White finds him standing at the television, and he subsequently sexually assaults her, only stopping after Skyler objects multiple times. Meanwhile, Jesse meets with an illegal arms dealer at a hot dog restaurant and purchases a Ruger SP101 handgun. The next day he tells Walt that he believes Tuco poses a threat to them and must be taken care of. Walt points out that shooting him would end badly, and the pair seem despondent. Elsewhere, Skyler refuses to answer phone calls from her sister, Marie Schrader. Marie and her husband Hank argue about whether she attempted to schedule a dinner with Skyler that conflicts with an appointment she has for therapy, revealing that Marie reluctantly goes to therapy for unspecified problems.

At the DEA field office, Hank's partner Steven Gomez shows him footage of two individuals stealing methylamine. The video depicts Walt and Jesse in disguise. Hank disparages their ability as thieves, but is intrigued by the fact that the unknown pair stole methylamine and used thermite to enter the warehouse. Gomez speculates they may be college-aged chemistry students, and Hank believes the two will encounter difficulty from the drug cartels for disrupting the meth trade. Walt becomes worried when he notices an SUV parked near his house and spends the night watching the street. Jesse encourages Walt to also purchase a gun, hoping to "double their chances" of success in the event of a shooting. Instead, Walt proposes that they kill Tuco in a more clandestine way, using ricin made from castor beans. Hank visits Skyler and asks her to make up with Marie. Skyler responds angrily, stating that her situation is worse than her sister’s. Hank and Skyler both realize that the other knows about Marie's shoplifting. (Note: As depicted in "...And the Bag's in the River" and "A No-Rough-Stuff-Type Deal".)

Walt and Jesse produce the ricin, hoping to trick Tuco into poisoning himself by placing it in the next meth delivery. As they finish their work, Walt receives a phone call from Hank, who is at a crime scene. Hank says that he screwed up in speaking to Skyler, and Walt forgives him. It is revealed that the crime scene is the junkyard and that Gonzo has accidentally died in a botched attempt to move No-Doze's body. Walt and Jesse panic as they believe that Tuco killed Gonzo, and Walt insists that Jesse leave town.

Walt returns home but avoids answering questions from Skyler. He receives a phone call and goes outside, to find Tuco holding Jesse at gunpoint in his car. Tuco forces Walt to enter the car and drives away.

== Production ==
The episode was written by J. Roberts and directed by Bryan Cranston. It aired on AMC in the United States and Canada on March 8, 2009.

The episode’s title references the amount of money Walt believes he needs in order to provide for his family. It is also a reference to the airplane crash featured in the intro being a Boeing 737. It is the first of several episodes including a flashforward with a pink teddy bear floating in a pool. Titles of episodes with similar flashforward sequences, when placed together, foreshadow the Wayfarer 515 disaster in "ABQ". When together, they read "Seven Thirty-Seven Down Over ABQ".

== Critical reception ==
Donna Bowman, writing for The A.V. Club, gave the episode an A−. She praised Cranston both for his performance and for his directing ability. Seth Amitin, of IGN, gave the episode an 8.7/10.

In 2019, The Ringer ranked "Seven Thirty-Seven" 39th out of the 62 total Breaking Bad episodes. Vulture ranked it 32nd overall.
