= A No-Rough-Stuff-Type Deal =

- Breaking Bad episode
- Tuco Salamanca has a visceral reaction to Walter and Jesse's new blue meth.
- Episode no.: Season 1 Episode 7
- Directed by: Tim Hunter
- Written by: Peter Gould
- Cinematography by: Rey Villalobos
- Editing by: Lynne Willingham
- Original air date: March 9, 2008
- Running time: 47 minutes

Guest appearances
- Raymond Cruz as Tuco Salamanca; Carmen Serano as Carmen Molina; Beth Bailey as Jodi Nichols; Geoffrey Rivas as a police officer; David House as Dr. Delcavoli; Jesus Payan as Gonzo; Cesar Garcia as No Doze

Episode chronology
| ← Previous "Crazy Handful of Nothin'" | Next → "Seven Thirty-Seven" |
- Breaking Bad season 1

"A No-Rough-Stuff-Type Deal" is the seventh and final episode of the first season of the American television drama series Breaking Bad. Written by Peter Gould and directed by Tim Hunter, it aired on AMC in the United States on March 9, 2008.

== Plot ==
Following his meeting with Tuco Salamanca, Walter White meets with Jesse Pinkman, who has put his house on the market due to his trauma from the deaths of Krazy-8 and Emilio. Walt tells Jesse that they will make two pounds of meth a week for Tuco, but Jesse says that doing so is impossible because he won't be able to obtain the needed amount of pseudoephedrine in time. As a result, Walt and Jesse are only able to make half a pound of meth by the time they have their first meeting with Tuco and his henchmen, Gonzo and No-Doze, at a junkyard. Tuco is furious that Walt's end of the bargain was not kept and threatens dire consequences if the next quota is not met. To make up for it, Walt promises to have four pounds of meth ready at the next meeting.

After returning to Jesse's house, Walt tells Jesse that they will manufacture the four pounds of meth using different precursors and gives him a list of chemicals and equipment to buy with Tuco's cash. Jesse manages to obtain everything except methylamine, explaining to Walt that some people offered to steal some from a chemical warehouse and give it to him, but he could not afford to pay them for the job. Walt decides that they will steal the methylamine themselves. That night, Walt and Jesse break into the warehouse and use a bag of thermite to melt the lock on a highly-secured door, allowing them to escape with a drum of methylamine.

Meanwhile, Skyler attempts to return an expensive baby's tiara that Marie gave her at her baby shower, only for the store owner to accuse her of shoplifting and have her detained in a storeroom. Realising Marie stole the tiara, Skyler feigns going into labor, persuading the staff to let her go. Skyler later confronts Marie about the theft, yet she denies having done anything.

The next day, Walt and Jesse find themselves unable to start up the RV, forcing them to cook in Jesse's basement. Unbeknownst to them, a house viewing is happening that day, and they narrowly avoid being caught when one man attempts to see the basement, after which Jesse declares that the house is no longer for sale and demands that everyone leave. Walt and Jesse successfully finish the cook and are able to supply Tuco with 4.6 pounds of meth at their next meeting. Despite its blue hue, it is still the same quality and Tuco pays. When No-Doze makes an offhand remark to Walt, however, an intoxicated Tuco perceives it as an insult and brutally beats him to the ground, terrifying Walt and Jesse. Tuco then tells Walt to meet next week before he and Gonzo, carrying the unconscious No-Doze, drive off.

== Production ==
The episode was written by Peter Gould and directed by Tim Hunter; it aired on AMC in the United States and Canada on March 9, 2008.

Series creator Vince Gilligan originally intended to have Jesse be murdered at the end of this episode in a botched drug deal. Gilligan changed his mind after the show began filming, having been strongly impressed by Aaron Paul's performance.

== Title meaning ==
The episode title is a reference to the 1996 film Fargo, in which Jerry Lundegaard used the phrase while discussing the kidnapping of his wife.

== Critical reception ==
Seth Amitin of IGN gave the episode a rating of 9.1 out of 10.

In 2019, The Ringer ranked "A No-Rough-Stuff-Type Deal" as the 35th best out of the 62 total Breaking Bad episodes. Vulture ranked it 28th overall.
