= 4 Days Out =

- Breaking Bad episode
- Walter White and Jesse Pinkman eating during a break from cooking methamphetamine.
- Episode no.: Season 2 Episode 9
- Directed by: Michelle MacLaren
- Written by: Sam Catlin
- Cinematography by: Michael Slovis
- Editing by: Kelley Dixon
- Original air date: May 3, 2009
- Running time: 47 minutes

Guest appearances
- Bob Odenkirk as Saul Goodman; Krysten Ritter as Jane Margolis; David House as Dr. Delcavoli

Episode chronology
← Previous "Better Call Saul"	Next → "Over"
- Breaking Bad season 2

"4 Days Out" is the ninth episode of the second season of the American television drama series Breaking Bad. It was written by Sam Catlin and directed by Michelle MacLaren. The episode aired on AMC on May 3, 2009.

== Plot ==
Walter White arrives at the hospital with his family to learn how he has reacted to chemotherapy. He is told that the results of the test will not be ready for a week, but sees a scan of his lungs and notices a prominent growth. Believing that he has little time left, and realizing that recent expenses and Saul Goodman's fees for money laundering leave him with little to give his family, he decides to spend several days cooking meth. He pressures Jesse Pinkman into joining him, on the false pretext that their supply of methylamine will soon spoil. Walt tells Skyler he's visiting his mother, as an excuse to go cook with Jesse.

At the cook site in the desert, Jesse leaves the RV's keys in the ignition switch, unaware that it is draining the battery. After a few days of cooking, Walt estimates that they have $672,000 worth of meth each, about $1.34 million total. With their portable generator out of gasoline, Jesse convinces Walt to take a break and find a hotel for the night, but when they go to start the RV, they find the battery dead.

They siphon off gasoline from the RV to the generator to jump-start it, but fuel spilled on the generator catches fire, and Jesse uses all of their drinking water to douse it. Jesse suggests they call Skinny Pete for help using Walt's cell phone; despite the risk of Skyler White discovering this in his cell phone records, Walt allows Jesse to make the call. When Skinny Pete does not arrive, they call him again, and discover he is far off the directions before the phone dies. Walter unsuccessfully tries to trickle charge the RV's battery by manually turning the generator's crank. As he begins to despair, Jesse tries to rouse him, and this inspires Walt to construct a battery from the materials they have on hand. The makeshift battery provides enough power to jump-start the RV, and they are able to return to Albuquerque.

Walt and his family return to the doctor the next week, and learn that Walt's cancer is in remission and his tumor has shrunk by 80%; the "growth" Walt spotted was simply inflamed tissue in his lung, and a resulting tear in his esophagus caused him to cough up blood, but can be treated. Walt's family is ecstatic, but Walt, after using the bathroom, punches a towel dispenser in rage, which bruises his knuckles.

== Production ==
The episode was directed by Michelle MacLaren and written by Sam Catlin. It aired on AMC in the United States and Canada on May 3, 2009.

== Critical reception ==
Emily St. James, writing for Slant, praised the episode for its cinematography: "It's also staggeringly beautiful, drinking in the desert landscape that dominates its running time with a wide-eyed sense for the beauty of the wilderness." She added that the episode continued the series' world-building, comparing it to the likes of The Wire and The Sopranos, stating "the best television series are full of the breadth and depth of the panoply of human life." Alan Sepinwall felt similarly, writing "image after image—the glowing orange light of the desert, the cool blues of the chemicals mixing together, the tableaux of the RV resting in the tall grass or Walt and Jesse enjoying the night air after a hard day's work—looked absolutely gorgeous." Donna Bowman, of The A.V. Club, gave the episode an A. She praised the episode for highlighting the characters' ability to act under pressure.

The Ringer ranked "4 Days Out" as the 27th best out of the 62 total Breaking Bad episodes. Vulture ranked it 19th overall.
