= Breaking Bad season 2 =

Second season of the AMC crime drama television series

Breaking Bad
- Season 2
- DVD cover
- Showrunner: Vince Gilligan
- Starring: Bryan Cranston; Anna Gunn; Aaron Paul; Dean Norris; Betsy Brandt; RJ Mitte
- No. of episodes: 13

Release
- Original network: AMC
- Original release: March 8 – May 31, 2009

Season chronology
- ← Previous; Season 1 Next → Season 3

The second season of the American television drama series Breaking Bad premiered on March 8, 2009, and concluded on May 31, 2009. It consisted of 13 episodes, each running approximately 47 minutes in length. AMC broadcast the second season on Sundays at 10:00 pm in the United States. The complete second season was released on Region 1 DVD and Region A Blu-ray on March 16, 2010.

== Cast ==
=== Main ===
- Bryan Cranston as Walter "Walt" White, a terminally ill high-school chemistry teacher in Albuquerque, New Mexico. Walt runs a methamphetamine business with his partner Jesse Pinkman.
- Anna Gunn as Skyler White, Walt's pregnant wife and a bookkeeper for Beneke Fabricators.
- Aaron Paul as Jesse Pinkman, a former student of Walt's and his current business partner.
- Dean Norris as Hank Schrader, Walt and Skyler's brother-in-law and a DEA agent.
- Betsy Brandt as Marie Schrader, Skyler's sister and Hank's wife. She is a radiologic technologist.
- RJ Mitte as Walter White Jr., Walt and Skyler's teenage son, who has cerebral palsy.

=== Recurring ===
- Krysten Ritter as Jane Margolis, Jesse's neighbor, landlord, and later girlfriend who is in recovery from drug addiction.
- Steven Michael Quezada as Steven Gomez, Hank's partner at the DEA.
- Charles Baker as Skinny Pete, one of Jesse's friends who helps sell Walt and Jesse's meth.
- Christopher Cousins as Ted Beneke, Skyler's boss at Beneke Fabricators and later, lover.
- Matt L. Jones as Badger, one of Jesse's friends who helps sell Walt and Jesse's meth.
- Bob Odenkirk as Saul Goodman, a sleazy criminal lawyer who becomes involved with Walt and Jesse's business.
- John de Lancie as Donald Margolis, Jane's father and Jesse's landlord who also works as an air traffic controller.
- Tom Kiesche as Clovis, Badger's cousin and junkyard owner.
- Rodney Rush as Combo, one of Jesse's friends who helps sell Walt and Jesse's meth.
- Michael Shamus Wiles as George Merkert, the head of the Albuquerque DEA office and Hank and Steve's boss.
- Raymond Cruz as Tuco Salamanca, a wrathful drug kingpin and formerly the distributor of Walt and Jesse's meth.
- Giancarlo Esposito as Gus Fring, the owner of the fictional fast-food chain, Los Pollos Hermanos. He is secretly a drug kingpin associated with the Cartel and becomes the new distributor of Walt and Jesse's meth.
- Tess Harper as Diane Pinkman, Jesse's mother.
- Mark Margolis as Hector Salamanca, Tuco's uncle and a former drug kingpin. He is paraplegic and non-verbal, only communicating using a bell.
- Sam McMurray as Dr. Victor Bravenec, one of Walt's surgeons.
- Carmen Serano as Principal Carmen Molina, the principal of J.P. Wynne High School, the school that Walter Jr. attends and Walt's place of work.

=== Guest ===
- Jeremiah Bitsui as Victor, Gus' loyal henchman.
- Nigel Gibbs as APD Detective Tim Roberts, a homicide investigator for the Albuquerque Police Department and one of Hank's colleagues.
- Jessica Hecht as Gretchen Schwartz, Walt's old friend and former fiancee.
- Tina Parker as Francesca Liddy, Saul's secretary.
- Danny Trejo as Tortuga, a member of the Cartel who's working as an informant for the DEA.
- Jonathan Banks as Mike Ehrmantraut, a "cleaner" and one of Saul's associates who also works for Gus.

== Episodes ==
The titles of the first, fourth, tenth, and thirteenth episodes form a sentence that reveals an event that takes place in the season finale (Seven Thirty-Seven Down Over ABQ).

No. overall	No. in season	Title	Directed by	Written by	Original release date	U.S. viewers (millions)
8	1	"Seven Thirty-Seven"	Bryan Cranston	J. Roberts	March 8, 2009	1.66
The opening scene in black-and-white film shows a partially burned stuffed animal floating in the White's backyard pool. Tuco and Gonzo return immediately to the junkyard meetup site asking Walt to resuscitate No-Doze, who has died from his injuries. Gonzo hides the body under a car. Fearful of Tuco's violent and unpredictable manner, Walt develops a plan to poison Tuco with untraceable ricin. Hank reviews the security surveillance footage of the methylamine warehouse break-in. The DEA finds the bodies of both Gonzo and No-Doze in the junkyard after Gonzo accidentally bleeds out, which sets off a manhunt for Tuco. After receiving a picture of Gonzo's body from a jesting Hank, Walt mistakenly believes Gonzo was murdered by Tuco and becomes convinced that Tuco will come after him and Jesse. Skyler tells Hank about Marie's shoplifting, and learns she has already been receiving therapy for kleptomania. Seeing headlights outside his home window, Walt hurriedly leaves a confused Skyler to investigate, where he finds Jesse being held at gunpoint by Tuco. Tuco orders Walt to get in the car and they drive away.
9	2	"Grilled"	Charles Haid	George Mastras	March 15, 2009	1.60
Tuco takes Walt and Jesse at gunpoint to a remote desert hideout, where he takes care of his uncle Hector Salamanca, a former drug kingpin who is now incapacitated due to a stroke and can only communicate with a bell. Tuco explains that Hank and the DEA have rolled his entire organization. Unaware of Gonzo's death, Tuco believes Gonzo has ratted him out and becomes extremely agitated. Tuco voices his plan to take Walt to Mexico and run a covert cooking operation in the jungle. After several unsuccessful attempts to have Tuco ingest the ricin, Hector warns Tuco using his bell that Walt and Jesse are not to be trusted. Enraged, Tuco attacks and attempts to kill Jesse, but Jesse manages to shoot him in the torso and escape. Meanwhile, Skyler enlists Hank to help track down Walt. After Marie reveals that Walt has a second cell phone, Skyler mentions that Jesse had been supplying Walt with marijuana. After visiting Jesse's mother, Hank tracks Jesse's car to Tuco's hideout and gets into a shootout with Tuco, whom he kills in self-defense. Seeing Hank from a distance, Walt and Jesse bury the gun and run off into the desert.
10	3	"Bit by a Dead Bee"	Terry McDonough	Peter Gould	March 22, 2009	1.13
Walt forms a plan to explain his and Jesse's disappearance and they split up to hitchhike back to the city. Walt goes to a supermarket alone, removes all his clothes, and wanders around the aisles feigning a disoriented state. He is hospitalized and claims to have no memory of the past several days. Walt is scheduled to undergo ongoing psychiatric evaluation, but is ultimately released after telling his psychiatrist that he simply wanted to be alone and faked his "fugue state" to cover this from his family. Jesse, who is now a fugitive, returns to his house and, with Badger's help, packs all of his lab equipment into the RV and arranges it to be towed. He then allows the DEA to find him in a motel room with a prostitute, with whom he claims to have been shacked up all weekend. Hank brings in Hector to identify him, but the old man refuses to cooperate with the authorities. Jesse is released, but the DEA confiscates all of his money. Walt convinces Jesse to continue cooking meth, saying that nothing has changed.
11	4	"Down"	John Dahl	Sam Catlin	March 29, 2009	1.29
While things have blown over with their disappearance, Jesse has no money and Walt cannot leave the house without Skyler wondering where he is. Jesse's parents, who own his house, order him to vacate, citing Hank's visit as the final straw. Now homeless and having his motorbike stolen, Jesse breaks into the lot where his RV is being kept and spends the night in it. Upon being confronted by the lot owner, Jesse steals the RV by driving through the locked gate. Walt tries to reconnect with Walt Jr. by giving him a driving lesson. Suspicious of Walt's actions, including his denial of having a second cell phone, Skyler begins going out all day and refuses to tell Walt of her whereabouts. An increasingly frustrated Walt continues to deny any wrongdoing. Jesse arrives at Walt's home and convinces him to give him half of their remaining money.
12	5	"Breakage"	Johan Renck	Moira Walley-Beckett	April 5, 2009	1.21
Walt continues his treatment and his condition improves, but he is concerned about the growing medical bills, which include the hospital visit in his "fugue state". Jesse begins to re-establish his life, paying off his debts and getting a new place to live. He develops an interest in his new next-door neighbor and landlord, Jane Margolis. Hank and the DEA come across the name Heisenberg, but are not sure if he is real or just an urban legend. Hank is promoted and appointed to a tristate drug task force, but experiences panic attacks due to his shootout with Tuco. Skyler and Marie reconcile over the tiara incident. As Walt and Jesse resume cooking, Jesse suggests they take over Tuco's role as a distributor to increase their profits; he recruits his friends Badger, Skinny Pete, and Combo as dealers. Skinny Pete is ripped off by a drug-addicted couple. Unimpressed, Walt tells Jesse that unless he does something about it, they will develop a reputation for being easy marks.
13	6	"Peekaboo"	Peter Medak	J. Roberts & Vince Gilligan	April 12, 2009	1.41
Walt returns to work. Gretchen Schwartz drops by the Whites' home where Skyler expresses her gratitude for paying for Walt's treatment. Gretchen does not reveal the truth to Skyler, but privately expresses her shock and anger to Walt, who bitterly tells her to mind her own business and blames her and Elliott for profiting off of his research and cutting him out. In response, Gretchen calls Skyler and tells her that she and Elliott can no longer pay for Walt's treatment. Walt covers by telling Skyler that Gretchen and Elliott are insolvent, which Skyler believes. Meanwhile, Jesse tracks down the couple—a man named Spooge and his female partner—who ripped off Skinny Pete, but finds only their young and heavily neglected son at the house. Jesse makes the boy food and watches TV with him until the couple returns home with a stolen ATM, after which they incapacitate Jesse. Later, the female addict crushes Spooge's skull under the ATM after he repeatedly insults her. Horrified, Jesse recovers the meth and cash from the ATM, calls the police, wraps the boy in a blanket on the front porch, and flees the scene.
14	7	"Negro y Azul"	Felix Alcala	John Shiban	April 19, 2009	1.20
Walt has trouble getting in touch with Jesse, who has been staying at home since his encounter with Spooge. Jesse is not providing product to his dealers, so Walt arranges to deliver it. He learns that the word on the street is that Jesse killed Spooge and, due to his new reputation as a cold-blooded killer, they are having no problem at all collecting payment. Walt decides the time has come to expand their territory and put Jesse's new reputation to good use. Skyler seeks a job and is rehired as a bookkeeper by her previous boss, Ted Beneke. Jesse and Jane continue to bond. Hank struggles to fit in at his new job in El Paso where he is perceived as a "gringo". During an investigation, Hank's task force comes across the severed head of an informant mounted on a tortoise, which causes Hank to feel sick and run to a nearby vehicle. He is mocked by the other agents before an explosive strapped to the tortoise goes off, killing or injuring several DEA agents, while Hank remains unharmed.
15	8	"Better Call Saul"	Terry McDonough	Peter Gould	April 26, 2009	1.04
Hank suffers from post-traumatic stress disorder after the bombing in El Paso. To help cheer Hank up, Walt gives him a motivational speech about his cancer diagnosis; Hank is encouraged to leave the house, but still experiences panic attacks. Jesse and Jane have begun a sexual relationship, and Jesse learns that Jane is in recovery from addiction. Badger is arrested in a sting operation by the Albuquerque police; Walt and Jesse hire a shady lawyer, Saul Goodman, who ensures that Badger will get off with a light sentence without having to give away Jesse or Walt's identity. Saul tells Walt and Jesse about an ex-convict named Jimmy, who makes a living being paid by other criminals to go to jail, and offers to have him stand in for Heisenberg. The DEA busts Jimmy when Badger gives them a fake deal, but Hank isn't completely convinced. Through a private investigator, Saul tracks down Walt at the school and offers his services as a full-time legal counsel and adviser for a cut of the profit.
16	9	"4 Days Out"	Michelle MacLaren	Sam Catlin	May 3, 2009	1.27
Walt is convinced that his medical condition is deteriorating; he continues to have coughing fits and is now coughing up blood. After Saul calculates the numbers, Walt realizes that there is not much money left for his family. With an excuse of visiting his mother, Walt and Jesse set off for the desert for a marathon cooking session over an extended weekend. During their trip, Jesse accidentally leaves the keys in the ignition, inadvertently draining the RV's battery. Walt and Jesse find themselves stuck in the middle of the desert, cold and without food or water. Walt's knowledge of chemistry again saves the day, as they build a makeshift battery providing enough power to jump-start the RV. Returning to Albuquerque, Walt and Skyler discover that Walt's cancer is in remission. Walt's family is ecstatic over the news, but Walt privately has a violent outburst.
17	10	"Over"	Phil Abraham	Moira Walley-Beckett	May 10, 2009	1.19
Despite the good news about his condition, Walt is unhappy, and he reveals to Jesse that he is out of the drug trade now that he no longer has to pay for treatment. Skyler decides to throw a party to celebrate the news and thank all of their friends for their support; Walt gets drunk and forces Walt Jr. to drink an excessive amount of tequila, provoking an argument with Hank. Embarrassed about his behavior, Walt tries to make amends. At work, Skyler breaks down and confides to Ted about Walt's condition. Jesse's relationship with Jane continues to grow, but he is taken aback when her father, Donald, drops in to see her; Jane does not introduce Jesse as her boyfriend. Jesse is upset that she does not take their relationship seriously, but the two ultimately reconcile after Jane gives him an apology. At a hardware store, Walt sees two men with an RV buying materials to make meth. Realizing he is being copied, Walt orders them to stay out of his territory.
18	11	"Mandala"	Adam Bernstein	George Mastras	May 17, 2009	1.29
After Combo is murdered by a rival gang, Skinny Pete decides to quit the drug trade. With no distribution network, Saul proposes a new distribution method by putting Walt and Jesse in touch with a meth distributor named Gus Fring, who is the owner of a regional fast food chain called Los Pollos Hermanos. Gus agrees to purchase Walt's product, but expresses concern about Jesse's drug problem, warning Walt never to trust a drug addict. Distraught over Combo's death, Jesse tells Jane what he does for work. Jane later relapses into drug addiction and introduces Jesse to heroin. Skyler finds out that Ted has been engaging in tax evasion from the IRS, but decides not to report it due to their past relationship. Walt receives a large offer for the short-notice delivery of the remainder of their inventory, but at the same time receives a call from Skyler, notifying him of her imminent labor.
19	12	"Phoenix"	Colin Bucksey	John Shiban	May 24, 2009	1.19
Walt delivers the inventory in time but misses his daughter's birth. Jesse confronts Walt about his share of the payment, but Walt refuses to disburse the funds until Jesse can prove his sobriety. Jesse and Jane's addiction is discovered by Donald, who agrees to give her one day to settle her affairs before going to rehab. In an effort to minimize the cost of Walt's upcoming surgery, Walt Jr. sets up a website to gather donations for his father's medical expenses. It is quickly used by Saul as a way to launder Walt's earnings so they can be spent without raising suspicion. After discovering Jesse's payday, Jane blackmails Walt into delivering Jesse's share. Later, Walt returns to Jesse's and finds Jesse and Jane passed out in bed after a drug binge, both lying on their sides. He tries to shake Jesse conscious and as he does so, Jane flops over onto her back. Jane vomits and begins to suffocate. Walt leans to turn her over but quickly changes his mind as he stands and watches Jane die.
20	13	"ABQ"	Adam Bernstein	Vince Gilligan	May 31, 2009	1.50
Jesse discovers Jane's passing and reaches out to Walt. Walt contacts Saul, who sends his private investigator and cleaner Mike to conceal Jesse's involvement in Jane's death. Jesse is distraught and flees; Walt later locates him in a crack house and takes him to rehab. Walt's funds are funneled into his son's website, which attracts the attention of the media, causing him to be overcome with shame. Walt's secretive behavior becomes a problem once again when he accidentally references a second cell phone while under the initial effects of anesthesia moments before his surgery. This prompts Skyler to investigate deeper, thereby revealing many of Walt's lies, including not taking any money from Gretchen and never visiting his mother, which spurs her to leave him. Donald, an air traffic controller, is distraught by Jane's death and accidentally allows a mid-air collision to occur between an airliner and a small plane in the sky above Albuquerque. The crash results in debris, including a scorched pink teddy bear and human remains, raining down onto the Whites' residence, as well as much of the city.

== Production ==
The writers of Breaking Bad planned the storyline for the entire season in advance of filming and knew how the season would end right from the beginning. That differed from subsequent seasons, in which the writers did not have a complete plan and developed the storyline as the episodes progressed. Series creator Vince Gilligan said of season two, "That came about through many, many hours of beating our heads against the wall—very laborious work, which is probably why we haven't repeated that formula since."

== Music ==
The original score for Breaking Bad was composed by Dave Porter. The show also uses music from other recording artists with music supervision by Thomas Golubić. Selected songs from Season 2 are featured on the Breaking Bad soundtrack available through iTunes and Amazon.

== Reception ==
=== Reviews ===
The second season of Breaking Bad received critical acclaim from critics, scoring 84 out of 100 on Metacritic. On review aggregator Rotten Tomatoes, the second season has an approval rating of 97% based on 36 reviews, with an average rating of 9.1/10. The site's critics consensus reads: "Breaking Bad continues to soar, thanks to its artsy style and suspenseful thrills." Entertainment Weekly critic Ken Tucker stated "Bad is a superlatively fresh metaphor for a middle-age crisis: It took cancer and lawbreaking to jolt Walt out of his suburban stupor, to experience life again—to take chances, risk danger, do things he didn't think himself capable of doing. None of this would work, of course, without Emmy winner Cranston's ferocious, funny selflessness as an actor. For all its bleakness and darkness, there's a glowing exhilaration about this series: It's a feel-good show about feeling really bad." San Francisco Chronicle's Tim Goodman claimed "The first three episodes of Season 2 that AMC sent out continue that level of achievement with no evident missteps. In fact, it looks as if Gilligan's bold vision for Breaking Bad, now duly rewarded against all odds, has invigorated everyone involved in the project. You can sense its maturity and rising ambition in each episode." Horror novelist Stephen King lauded the series, comparing it to Twin Peaks and Blue Velvet. Alan Sepinwall of The Star-Ledger praised the season, calling it "brilliant". He lauded the sound design as well as the cinematography, enjoying the "emphasis of beautiful desert vistas and disturbing tableaux". He also compared the series to The Sopranos, more specifically on the similarity of Walter White and Tony Soprano and their respective reactions to similar situations. David Hinckley of the New York Daily News praised Cranston's performance of Walter White, calling him "one of the best played characters on television".

=== Awards and nominations ===
The second season received numerous awards and nominations, including five Primetime Emmy Award nominations with two wins. Bryan Cranston won his second consecutive award for Outstanding Lead Actor in a Drama Series and Lynne Willingham won her second consecutive award for Outstanding Single-Camera Picture Editing for a Drama Series for "ABQ". The series received its first nomination for Outstanding Drama Series, Aaron Paul received his first nomination for Outstanding Supporting Actor in a Drama Series, and Michael Slovis was nominated for Outstanding Cinematography for a One Hour Series for "ABQ".

Cranston won the Television Critics Association Award for Individual Achievement in Drama, with the series being nominated for Outstanding Achievement in Drama. Cranston won his second consecutive Satellite Award for Best Actor in a Drama Series, with the series winning the award for Best Drama Series. Aaron Paul won the Saturn Award for Best Supporting Actor on Television, with the series winning the award for Best Syndicated/Cable Television Series. The series received two Writers Guild of America Award nominations, for Best Drama Series, and John Shiban for Best Episodic Drama for "Phoenix".

Year	Award	Category	Recipient	Result	Ref.
2009	Primetime Emmy Awards	Outstanding Drama Series	Breaking Bad	Nominated	
2009	Primetime Emmy Awards	Outstanding Actor in a Drama Series	Bryan Cranston for the episode: "Phoenix"	Won	
2009	Primetime Emmy Awards	Outstanding Supporting Actor in a Drama Series	Aaron Paul for the episode: "Peekaboo"	Nominated	
2009	Primetime Emmy Awards	Outstanding Cinematography for a Single-Camera Series (One Hour)	Michael Slovis for the episode: "ABQ"	Nominated	
2009	Primetime Emmy Awards	Outstanding Single-Camera Picture Editing - Drama Series	Lynne Willingham for the episode: "ABQ"	Won	

== Home media ==
The second season was released on DVD in Region 1 and Blu-ray in Region A on March 16, 2010. It was released on DVD in Region 2 on July 26, 2010 and in Region 4 on February 8, 2010.
