= Grilled (Breaking Bad) =

- Breaking Bad episode
- Tuco Salamanca threatens both Walter White and Jesse Pinkman.
- Episode no.: Season 2 Episode 2
- Directed by: Charles Haid
- Written by: George Mastras
- Cinematography by: Michael Slovis
- Editing by: Skip Macdonald
- Original air date: March 15, 2009
- Running time: 48 minutes

Guest appearances
- Raymond Cruz as Tuco Salamanca; Tess Harper as Diane Pinkman; Mark Margolis as Hector Salamanca; Steven Michael Quezada as Steven Gomez; Nigel Gibbs as Tim Roberts

Episode chronology
← Previous "Seven Thirty-Seven"	Next → "Bit by a Dead Bee"
- Breaking Bad season 2

"Grilled" is the second episode of the second season of the American television drama series Breaking Bad and the 9th episode overall. It was written by George Mastras and directed by Charles Haid. The episode aired on AMC on March 15, 2009.

This episode marks the first appearance of Mark Margolis as Hector Salamanca, and the final appearance of Raymond Cruz as Tuco Salamanca in Breaking Bad.

== Plot ==
Having been kidnapped by Tuco Salamanca, Walter White and Jesse Pinkman are held prisoner in a desert hideout where Tuco takes care of his paralyzed and mute uncle, Hector Salamanca. Hector is incapacitated from the neck down and unable to speak, but he can communicate with a desk bell attached to his wheelchair. (Note: Revealed to be result of stroke caused by Nacho Varga in Better Call Saul's "Lantern.") Tuco explains that Hank Schrader and the DEA have rounded up Tuco's entire organization. Unaware of Gonzo's death, Tuco believes that Gonzo has ratted him out. He intends to keep Walt and Jesse in the compound until his cousins arrive at sunset to take them all across the border to Mexico, where they will cook meth for Tuco 24/7.

Meanwhile, Walt's family has realized he is missing. Hank takes time off to look for Walt. Skyler White is sick with worry and has been distributing handbills with Walt's photo. Marie Schrader, who believes Jesse is Walt's marijuana dealer, pleads with Hank to question Jesse. Hank talks to Jesse's mother, Diane Pinkman. Mrs. Pinkman supplies Hank with information letting him follow the LoJack tracking system in Jesse's car.

At the hideout, Walt poisons Tuco's food with the ricin he has prepared, but Hector observes this and knocks the plate off the table. Tuco realizes Walt and Jesse are plotting something and takes them outside, holding a gun to Jesse's head and forcing Walt to confess to the poisoning. With Tuco distracted, Jesse overpowers him, hitting him in the head with a rock and shooting him in the abdomen with his pistol. When they see a vehicle approaching in the distance, Walt and Jesse quickly crawl into hiding, assuming that it is Tuco's cousins. Hank exits the vehicle and confronts the injured Tuco, who shoots at him, forcing Hank to fatally shoot Tuco in self-defense. Hank begins to investigate the scene as Walt and Jesse silently escape.

== Production ==
"Grilled" was written by George Mastras and directed by Charles Haid. It aired on AMC in the United States and Canada on March 15, 2009.

== Reception ==
Seth Amitin, of IGN, criticized the episode for prolonging Walt and Jesse's entrance into the drug trade. He gave the episode an 8.9/10.

In 2019, The Ringer ranked "Grilled", as the 25th best out of the 62 total Breaking Bad episodes. Vulture ranked it 30th overall.
