= Moira Walley-Beckett =

Canadian-American writer and producer

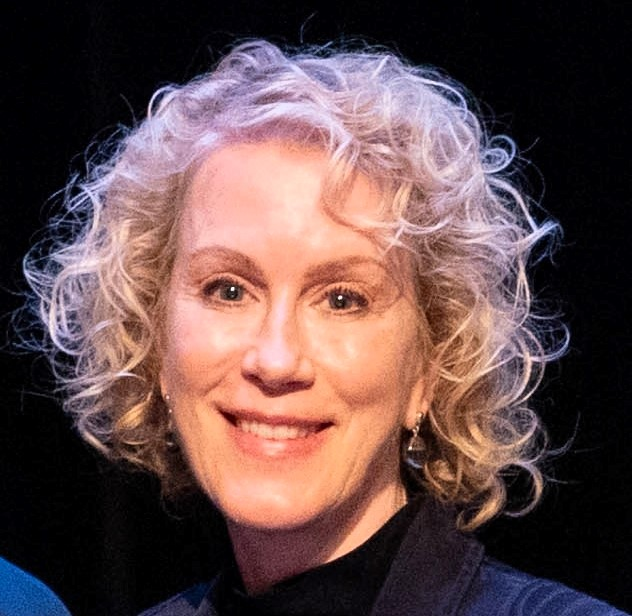
- Walley-Beckett in 2023
- Born: Canada
- Occupations: Screenwriter; producer; actress

Moira Walley-Beckett is a Canadian-American screenwriter, producer, and former actress. She is best known for her work as a writer and producer on Breaking Bad. She wrote nine episodes of the series, including "Ozymandias", widely regarded as one of the greatest television episodes of all time.

For her work on Breaking Bad, Walley-Beckett won three Primetime Emmy Awards (including Outstanding Writing for a Drama Series), three Writers Guild of America Awards, two Producers Guild of America Awards, one Golden Globe, and one Peabody. She also created the series Flesh and Bone and Anne with an E.

== Life and career ==
=== Early years and education ===
Walley-Beckett was raised in Vancouver and attended the Banff School of Fine Arts. In 1982, she joined the Arts Club Theatre Company.

=== Career ===
Walley-Beckett worked from the mid-1980s until the early-2000s as a television actress. She guest-starred on many series, including MacGyver, 21 Jump Street, Wiseguy, The Pretender, Chicago Hope, Diagnosis Murder, ER and Tropical Heat. ( only episode 6 season one ).

She began writing for television in 2007 as a staff writer for the short-lived NBC detective drama Raines, starring Jeff Goldblum. In 2008 she joined the writing staff for the legal drama Eli Stone and penned the episode "Heal the Pain".

She joined Breaking Bad as a story editor for the second season and wrote the episodes "Breakage" and "Over". The second season writing staff were nominated for the Writers Guild of America (WGA) Award for best drama series at the February 2010 ceremony for their work on the second season. She was promoted to co-producer for the third season in 2010 and wrote the episodes "Mas" and (with Sam Catlin) "Fly." She was promoted again to producer for the fourth season in 2011.

For the fifth season, Walley-Beckett wrote "Gliding Over All" and "Ozymandias"; the latter received universal praise from critics, and has since been called one of the greatest episodes of television ever broadcast. On August 25, 2014 she won the Primetime Emmy Award for Outstanding Writing for a Drama Series for "Ozymandias", becoming the first solo woman to win the award in the Drama category since Ann Biderman won in 1994.

After Breaking Bad ended, Walley-Beckett, a former ballet dancer, created the ballet drama miniseries Flesh and Bone for Starz. The show premiered in November 2015.

In January 2016, it was announced that Walley-Beckett would create, write and executive produce a television series based on children's classic Anne of Green Gables for Canada's CBC. Netflix came aboard in August to distribute the show internationally. The series, Anne with an E (titled Anne during the first season) aired on CBC in Canada and was later made available for streaming on Netflix. The series premiered on March 19, 2017, on CBC and on May 12 internationally. It was renewed for a second season on August 3, 2017, and for a third season in August 2018. Shortly after the third season was released in Fall 2019, CBC and Netflix announced that the series was canceled.

She wrote the 2018 film The Grizzlies alongside Justified creator Graham Yost, directed by Miranda de Pencier.

== Filmography ==
Production staff

Year	Show	Role	Notes
2017–2019	Anne with an E	Creator, showrunner, writer	Seasons 1-3
2015	Flesh and Bone	Creator, showrunner, writer	Season 1
2011–12	Pan Am	Producer	Season 1
2013	Breaking Bad	Producer	Season 5
2012	Breaking Bad	Producer	Season 5
2011	Breaking Bad	Producer	Season 4
2010	Breaking Bad	Co-producer	Season 3
2009	Breaking Bad	Story editor	Season 2

Writer

Year	Show	Season	Episode Title	Episode	Notes
2019	Anne with an E	3	"The Better Feelings of My Heart"	10	
2019	Anne with an E	3	"A Secret Which I Desired to Divine"	1	
2018	Anne with an E	2	"The Growing Good of the World"	10	
2018	Anne with an E	2	"What We Have Been Makes Us What We Are"	9	
2018	Anne with an E	2	"Youth Is the Season of Hope"	1	
2017	Anne with an E	1	"Wherever You Are Is My Home"	7	
2017	Anne with an E	1	"Remorse Is the Poison of Life"	6	
2017	Anne with an E	1	"Tightly Knotted to a Similar String"	5	
2017	Anne with an E	1	"An Inward Treasure Born"	4	
2017	Anne with an E	1	"But What Is So Headstrong as Youth?"	3	
2017	Anne with an E	1	"I Am No Bird, and No Net Ensnares Me"	2	
2017	Anne with an E	1	"Your Will Shall Decide Your Destiny"	1	
2015	Flesh and Bone	1	"Scorched Earth"	8	
2015	Flesh and Bone	1	"Cannon Fodder"	2	
2015	Flesh and Bone	1	"Bulling Through"	1	
2012	Pan Am	1	"Romance Languages"	13	
2011	Pan Am	1	"Kiss Kiss Bang Bang"	9	co-wrote with Lydia Woodward
2011	Pan Am	1	"Eastern Exposure"	4	co-wrote with Jack Orman
2013	Breaking Bad	5	"Ozymandias"	14	also appeared as an extra, a customer at the Whites’ car wash
2012	Breaking Bad	5	"Gliding Over All"	8	
2011	Breaking Bad	4	"End Times"	12	co-wrote with Thomas Schnauz
2011	Breaking Bad	4	"Bug"	9	co-wrote with Thomas Schnauz
2011	Breaking Bad	4	"Bullet Points"	4	
2010	Breaking Bad	3	"Fly"	10	co-wrote with Sam Catlin
2010	Breaking Bad	3	"Mas"	5	
2009	Breaking Bad	2	"Over"	10	
2009	Breaking Bad	2	"Breakage"	5	
2008	Eli Stone	1	"Heal the Pain"	7	co-wrote with Alex Taub
