= Sam Catlin =

American TV writer and producer

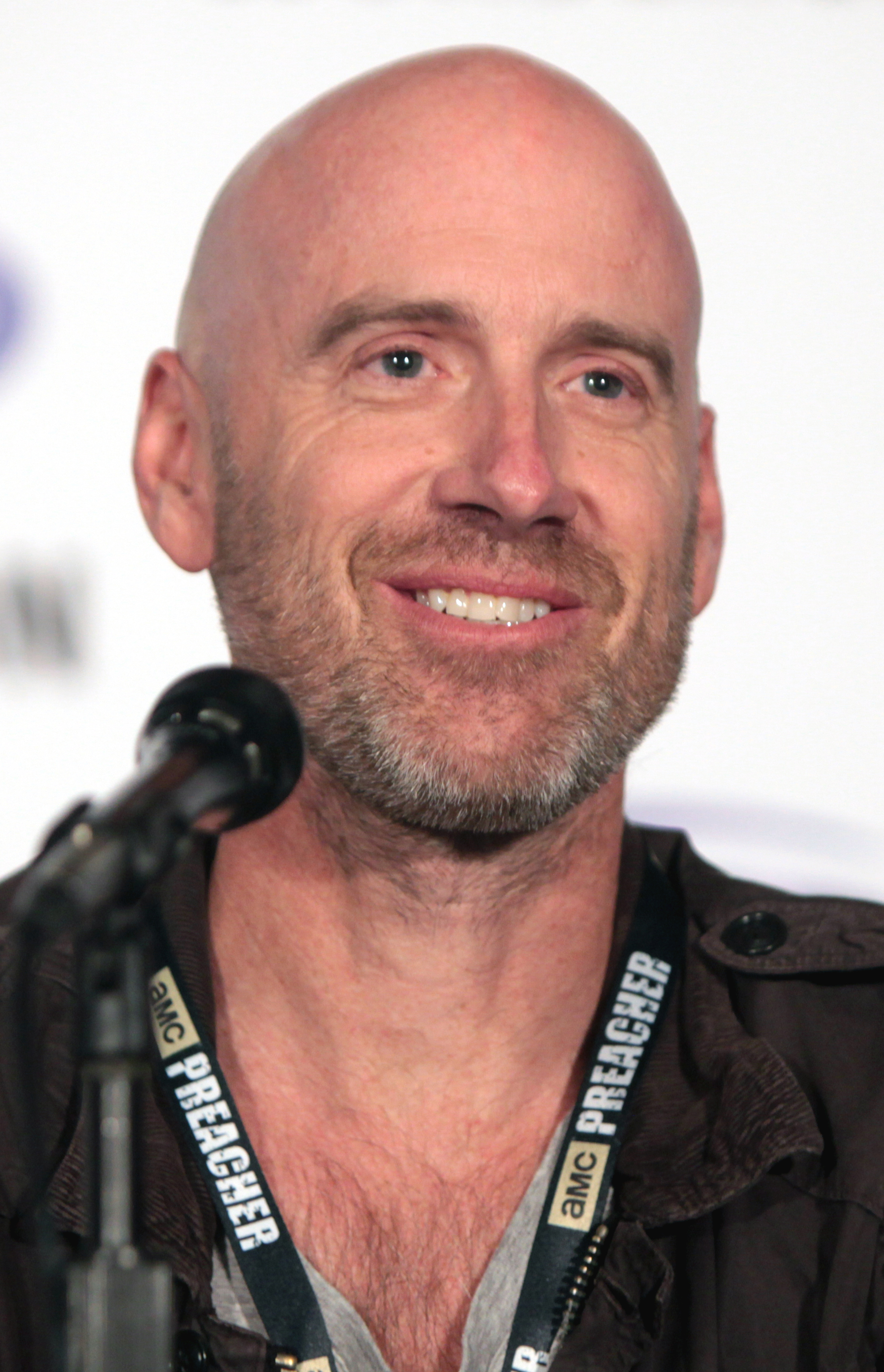
- Catlin in 2016
- Education: New York University (MFA)
- Occupation: Television writer
- Spouse: Julie Dretzin
- Writing career
- Notable works: Breaking Bad, Preacher

Sam Catlin is an American television writer, director, and producer. He is the showrunner of AMC's Preacher, and previously worked as a writer/producer on Breaking Bad. He was nominated for a Writers Guild of America (WGA) Award for his work on Breaking Bad.

== Biography ==
Catlin began writing for television in 2005 for the television film The Great New Wonderful. He then became a writer and story editor for the first season of Kidnapped in 2006. He wrote the episode "Front Page". In 2007, he became an executive story editor and writer for the short-lived series Canterbury's Law and wrote the episode "Baggage".

Catlin joined the crew of AMC series Breaking Bad in 2009 as a co-producer and writer for the second season. He wrote the second-season episodes "Down" and "4 Days Out". The second season writing staff were nominated for the WGA award for best drama series at the February 2010 ceremony for their work on the second season. Catlin was promoted to supervising producer for the third season in 2010. He was promoted again to co-executive producer for the fourth season in 2011.

In 2013, Catlin signed with Sony Pictures Television to help develop original projects, while becoming a co-executive producer for Fox's short-lived adaption of the Australian series of the same name, Rake.

In November 2013, it was announced that Catlin was developing Preacher for AMC based on the DC Vertigo comic book series of the same name with Seth Rogen and Evan Goldberg, that would be distributed by Sony Pictures Television. Catlin was confirmed as the showrunner in February 2014. Catlin wrote the pilot episode for the series, and continued to serve as the showrunner for all four seasons.

In October 2021, Catlin had signed an overall deal with Apple Inc. He currently serves as the showrunner of Apple TV series Sugar starring Colin Farrell.

Catlin attended the New York University Tisch School of the Arts Graduate Acting Program, where he received his Master of Fine Arts Degree in 1998.

== Filmography ==
=== Television ===
Writer

Year	Show	Season	Episode title	Episode	Notes
2024	Sugar	1	"Farewell"	8	Co-written with Donald Joh
2024	Sugar	1	"The Friends You Keep"	7	Co-written with Donald Joh
2024	Sugar	1	"Go Home"	6	Co-written with Donald Joh
2019	Preacher	4	"End of the World"	10	Also directed
2019	Preacher	4	"Masada"	1	Co-written with Kevin Rosen
2018	Preacher	3	"The Light Above"	10	Also directed
2018	Preacher	3	"Angelville"	1	
2017	Preacher	2	"The End of the Road"	13	
2017	Preacher	2	"On Your Knees"	12	Co-written with Rachel Wagner
2017	Preacher	2	"Mumbai Sky Tower"	2	
2017	Preacher	2	"On the Road"	1	
2016	Preacher	1	"Call and Response"	10	Also directed
2016	Preacher	1	"See"	2	
2016	Preacher	1	"Pilot"	1	Story by Seth Rogen & Evan Goldberg & Sam Catlin; Teleplay by Sam Catlin
2014	Rake	1	"Mammophile"	13	
2013	Breaking Bad	5	"Rabid Dog"	12	
2012	Breaking Bad	5	"Fifty-One"	4	
2011	Breaking Bad	4	"Crawl Space"	11	Co-written with George Mastras
2011	Breaking Bad	4	"Hermanos"	8	Co-written with George Mastras
2011	Breaking Bad	4	"Open House"	3	
2010	Breaking Bad	3	"Half Measures"	12	Co-written with Peter Gould
2010	Breaking Bad	3	"Fly"	10	Co-written with Moira Walley-Beckett
2010	Breaking Bad	3	"Green Light"	4	
2009	Breaking Bad	2	"4 Days Out"	9	
2009	Breaking Bad	2	"Down"	4	
2008	Canterbury's Law	1	"Baggage"	2	
2007	Kidnapped	1	"Front Page"	7	

Production staff

Year	Show	Role	Notes
2026	Sugar	Executive producer	Season 2
2024	Sugar	Executive producer	Season 1
2019	Preacher	Executive producer	Season 4
2018	Preacher	Executive producer	Season 3
2017	Preacher	Executive producer	Season 2
2016	Preacher	Executive producer	Season 1
2014	Rake	Consulting producer	Season 1
2013	Breaking Bad	Co-executive producer	Season 5
2012	Breaking Bad	Co-executive producer	Season 5
2011	Breaking Bad	Co-executive producer	Season 4
2010	Breaking Bad	Supervising producer	Season 3
2009	Breaking Bad	Co-producer	Season 2

=== Film ===
Year	Title	Role	Notes
2005	The Great New Wonderful	Writer	
