= Peter Gould =

American television writer and producer

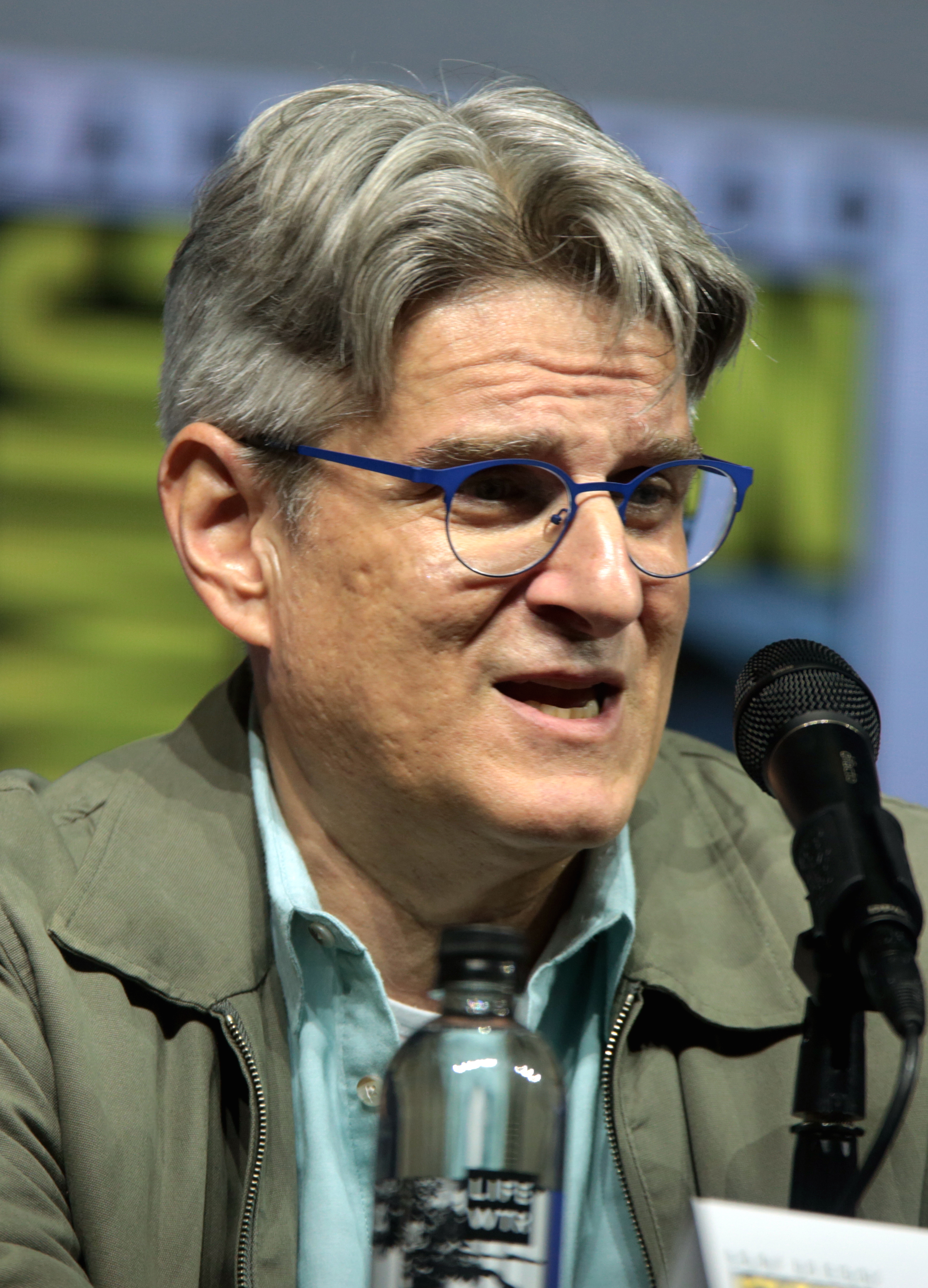
- Gould in 2018
- Born: New York City, U.S.
- Education: Sarah Lawrence College (BA); University of Southern California (MFA)
- Occupations: Screenwriter; producer
- Spouse: Nora Doyle
- Children: 1

Peter Gould is an American television writer, director and producer. He worked on all five seasons of the AMC drama Breaking Bad, and was nominated for four Writers Guild of America (WGA) Awards for his work on the series. After Breaking Bad ended, he went on to become the co-creator and co-showrunner, with Breaking Bad creator Vince Gilligan, of the show's spinoff, Better Call Saul. He became the series' sole showrunner after Gilligan left the writers' room. He was the senior writer throughout both series' run.

== Education ==
Gould was born in New York City. In 1978, Gould graduated from the Lawrenceville School, a private preparatory school in New Jersey, before entering Sarah Lawrence College, earning a Bachelor of Arts degree in English in 1982. In 1990, he graduated from the University of Southern California with a Master of Fine Arts.

== Career ==
After graduating from college, he produced commercials in New York. He soon entered USC Film School, where he would later teach.

In 2008, he joined the writing staff of the first season of Breaking Bad as a story editor. He wrote the first-season episode "A No-Rough-Stuff-Type Deal". The first season writing staff was nominated for the Writers Guild of America (WGA) Award for best new series at the February 2009 ceremony.

Gould was promoted to executive story editor for the second season. He wrote the second-season episodes "Bit by a Dead Bee" and "Better Call Saul". The writing staff was nominated for the WGA award for best drama series at the February 2010 ceremony for their work on the second season. Gould was promoted to producer for the third season and wrote the episode "Caballo sin Nombre" and co-wrote the episode "Kafkaesque" with fellow producer George Mastras. Gould was promoted again to supervising producer for the fourth season in 2011. During this season, he directed his first episode of television, “Problem Dog”.

In 2011, he wrote the HBO television film Too Big to Fail based on Andrew Ross Sorkin's book of the same name chronicling the events of the 2008 financial crisis and the collapse of Lehman Brothers from the point of view of Wall Street CEOs and US government regulators.

With Gilligan, he became co-creator and co-showrunner of the spinoff series, Better Call Saul. The show debuted on February 8, 2015, and was the highest-rated cable television series premiere to date. Gould would become the series sole showrunner after Gilligan left the writing staff early in the third season to focus on other projects. This transition had been planned since the show's debut.

The episode "Uno" from the first season of Better Call Saul won the 2015 Writers Guild of America award for Best Dramatic Episode in February 2016. The episode was written by Gould and Gilligan.

In 2017 and 2022, Better Call Saul was honored with a Peabody Award for "developing its own unique tone mixing legal drama, crime thriller, and dark comedy."

He created Disinherited for FX, starring Victoria Pedretti and Kiera Allen. The network gave the pilot order in 2025, with Gould serving as writer and director. In March 2026, the pilot was picked up to series.

== Personal life ==
Gould and his wife Nora Doyle have one child, a daughter, together.

== Filmography ==
Screenplays

Year	Title	Role	Notes
1994	Double Dragon	Co-writer	Based on the video game
2000	Meeting Daddy	Writer and director	
2011	Too Big to Fail	Writer	Television film

Television episodes credits

Year	Show	Season	Episode number	Episode title	Director	Writer	Notes
2008	Breaking Bad	1	7	"A No-Rough-Stuff-Type Deal"	No	Yes	
2009	Breaking Bad	2	3	"Bit by a Dead Bee"	No	Yes	
2009	Breaking Bad	2	8	"Better Call Saul"	No	Yes	
2010	Breaking Bad	3	2	"Caballo sin Nombre"	No	Yes	
2010	Breaking Bad	3	9	"Kafkaesque"	No	Yes	Co-written with George Mastras
2010	Breaking Bad	3	12	"Half Measures"	No	Yes	Co-written with Sam Catlin
2011	Breaking Bad	4	7	"Problem Dog"	Yes	Yes	
2011	Breaking Bad	4	10	"Salud"	No	Yes	Co-written with Gennifer Hutchison
2012	Breaking Bad	5	3	"Hazard Pay"	No	Yes	
2013	Breaking Bad	5	9	"Blood Money"	No	Yes	
2013	Breaking Bad	5	15	"Granite State"	Yes	Yes	
2015	Better Call Saul	1	1	"Uno"	No	Yes	Co-written with Vince Gilligan
2015	Better Call Saul	1	2	"Mijo"	No	Yes	
2015	Better Call Saul	1	10	"Marco"	Yes	Yes	
2016	Better Call Saul	2	9	"Nailed"	Yes	Yes	
2017	Better Call Saul	3	1	"Mabel"	No	Yes	Co-written with Vince Gilligan
2017	Better Call Saul	3	10	"Lantern"	Yes	No	
2018	Better Call Saul	4	1	"Smoke"	No	Yes	
2018	Better Call Saul	4	10	"Winner"	No	Yes	Co-written with Thomas Schnauz
2020	Better Call Saul	5	1	"Magic Man"	No	Yes	
2020	Better Call Saul	5	10	"Something Unforgivable"	Yes	Yes	Co-written with Ariel Levine
2022	Better Call Saul	6	1	"Wine and Roses"	No	Yes	
2022	Better Call Saul	6	13	"Saul Gone"	Yes	Yes	

Production staff

Year	Show	Role	Notes
2008	Breaking Bad	Story editor	Season 1
2009	Breaking Bad	Executive story editor	Season 2
2010	Breaking Bad	Producer	Season 3
2011	Breaking Bad	Supervising producer	Season 4
2012	Breaking Bad	Co-executive producer	Season 5
2013	Breaking Bad	Co-executive producer	Season 5
2015	Better Call Saul	Executive producer	Season 1
2016	Better Call Saul	Executive producer	Season 2
2017	Better Call Saul	Executive producer	Season 3
2018	Better Call Saul	Executive producer	Season 4
2020	Better Call Saul	Executive producer	Season 5
2022	Better Call Saul	Executive producer	Season 6
2025	Pluribus	Consulting producer	Season 1
