= Terry McDonough =

British television director

- Occupation: Television director
- Years active: 1985–present

Terry McDonough is a British television director.

He has been active since 1985. He moved on to directing episodes of Peak Practice, Eleventh Hour, Where the Heart Is, Sweet Medicine, The Royal, Wire in the Blood, The Street and Vincent.

In 2008, he began directing episodes of American television series namely Breaking Bad, The Gates, No Ordinary Family, Tower Prep, Criminal Minds: Suspect Behavior and the mystery miniseries Clue.

In January 2013, he was announced as the director of the BBC docudrama An Adventure in Space and Time, which depicts the creation of the iconic British science-fiction series Doctor Who.

In 2015 and 2016, he directed four episodes of the first season of The Expanse, including the pilot episode and the season finale.

He directed the 2024 film Damaged starring Samuel L. Jackson and Vincent Cassel.
