= Over (Breaking Bad) =

- Breaking Bad episode
- Walter White confronts his brother-in-law Hank Schrader
- Episode no.: Season 2 Episode 10
- Directed by: Phil Abraham
- Written by: Moira Walley-Beckett
- Cinematography by: Michael Slovis
- Editing by: Lynne Willingham
- Original air date: May 10, 2009
- Running time: 47 minutes

Guest appearances
- Krysten Ritter as Jane Margolis; Christopher Cousins as Ted Beneke; John de Lancie as Donald Margolis; Steven Michael Quezada as Steven Gomez; Carmen Serano as Carmen Molina

Episode chronology
← Previous "4 Days Out"	Next → "Mandala"
- Breaking Bad season 2

"Over" is the tenth episode of the second season of the American television action drama series Breaking Bad. Jane Margolis's father Donald is introduced (played by John de Lancie). It was written by Moira Walley-Beckett and directed by Phil Abraham. The episode aired on AMC on May 10, 2009.

== Plot ==
Following his discovery that he is in remission, Walter White takes Skyler's advice to take the week off from work, but secretly meets with Jesse Pinkman. He tells Jesse the news, and that he is out of the drug trade now that he no longer has to pay for treatment. During Skyler's party celebrating the remission, Walt pours Walt Jr. some tequila that he and Hank Schrader are drinking. After Walt pours an excessive amount, Hank takes the bottle away from him. Walt angrily demands it back, leading to a tense standoff which is broken as Walt Jr. vomits into the pool.

The next day, Skyler refuses to answer Walt's calls in which he tries to apologize. In order to distract himself, he goes on a home improvement spree with his drug money, replacing their water heater, then creating a crawl space in the basement to fix a rot problem. At work, Skyler confides in Ted Beneke about Walt's condition. When Ted notices that she is purposefully staying late, she breaks down, saying that she doesn't feel optimistic because she knows that Walt still has cancer. Ted understands, having suffered physically while caring for his dying father. They tenderly hold hands. The next day, as Ted is leaving, Skyler creates a distraction in order to spend more time with him.

Meanwhile, Jesse clumsily makes breakfast for Jane Margolis and tells her they can spend the day together. She admires his drawings of superheroes, which she points out all look like him. They hear knocking on Jane's door, which turns out to be her father, the owner of the property. When Jesse goes outside to speak with him, Jane acts like she does not know him. Later, she tells him she was protecting him from her overbearing father, but Jesse is upset that she does not take their relationship seriously. He smokes meth to comfort himself, but brightens when Jane slides a drawing under his door: a superhero called "Apology Girl" that looks like her.

At the hardware store, Walt notices the cart of a young man buying materials to make drugs. He offers advice about what ingredients to get, causing the man to run away. Outside in the parking lot, Walt sees the young man and his partner are using an RV; he realizes he is being copied. He orders the two to "stay out of my territory". Frightened, they drive away as Walt watches in satisfaction.

== Production ==
The episode was written by Moira Walley-Beckett, and directed by Phil Abraham. It aired on AMC in the United States and Canada on May 10, 2009.

== Critical reception ==
Donna Bowman, writing for The A.V. Club, gave the episode an A rating. She praised the show's ability to create a contrast between "intensity" and "quieter character moments".

In 2019, The Ringer ranked "Over" 45th out of the 62 total Breaking Bad episodes. Vulture ranked it 57th overall.
