= Michael Slovis =

American cinematographer and television director

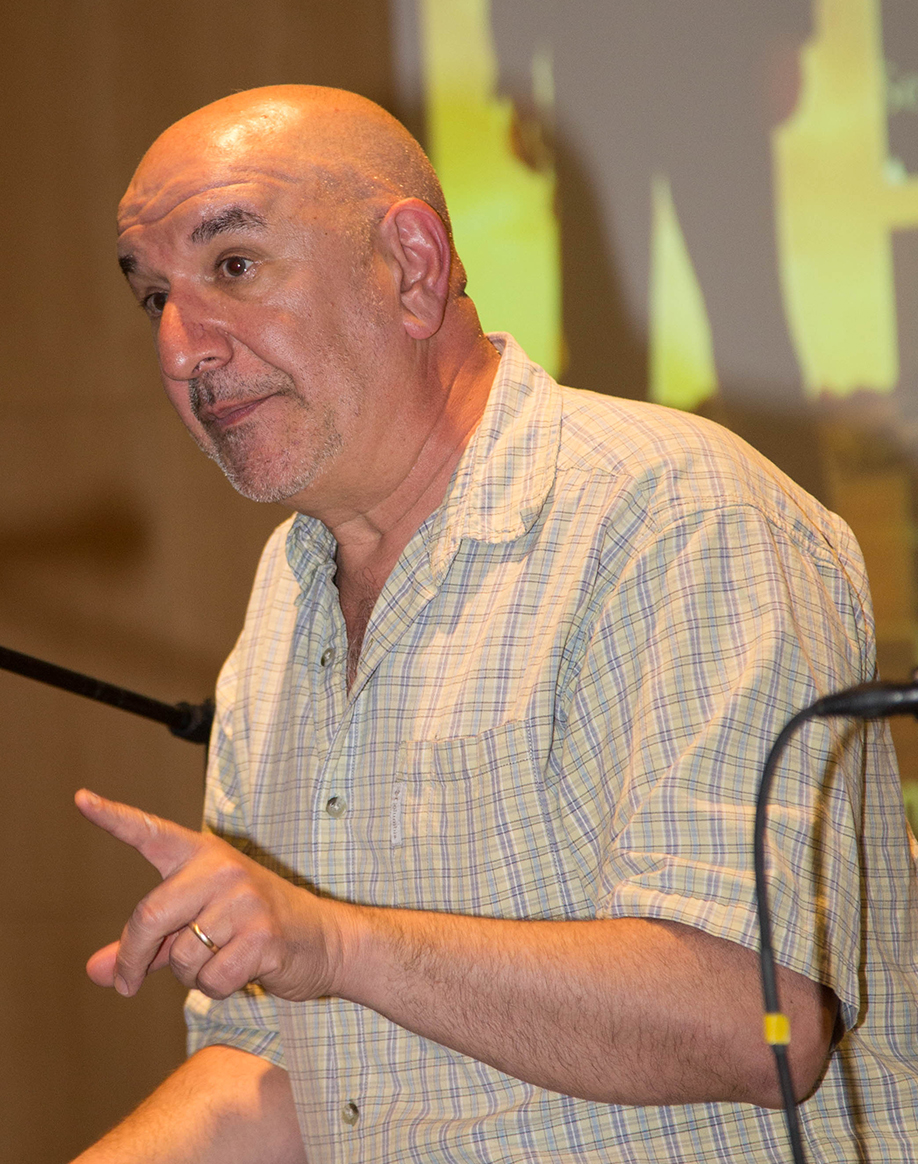
- Slovis at the 2013 Montclair Film Festival
- Born: Plainfield, New Jersey, U.S.
- Education: Rochester Institute of Technology; Tisch School of the Arts
- Occupations: Cinematographer, television director, television producer
- Years active: 1980–2014 (Cinematography); 2001–present (Director)
- Spouse: Maria Slovis
- Children: 3

Michael Slovis, ASC is an American cinematographer, television director, and producer.

== Early life and education ==
Slovis was born in Plainfield, New Jersey.

He was educated at the Rochester Institute of Technology and New York University's Tisch School of the Arts.

== Career ==
For many years, he worked as a camera operator on films. He became a cinematographer in 1995, working on the films Party Girl (1995), Half Past Dead (2002), Halloweentown (1998), The Thirteenth Year (1999), and Ready to Run (2000). In 2000, Slovis became a cinematographer on the series Ed, and worked on the series CSI: Crime Scene Investigation, New Amsterdam, Fringe, Royal Pains, Rubicon, Running Wilde, Breaking Bad, and Better Call Saul.

As a director, Slovis made his directorial debut with the 2001 television film Spirit. Later, he directed episodes of Ed, CSI: Crime Scene Investigation, Rubicon, Breaking Bad, Law & Order: Special Victims Unit, and Hell on Wheels In 2006, Slovis won a Primetime Emmy Award for Outstanding Cinematography for a One Hour Series for his work on CSI.

In 2014, Slovis directed the first two episodes of the fifth season of the HBO series Game of Thrones, titled "The Wars to Come" and "The House of Black and White". In 2017, he directed episode 3 of the second season of the series Preacher. Slovis directed the episodes "Thank You", "Something They Need", and "Worth" of The Walking Dead, and returned to the franchise by directing two episodes of the spin-off series The Walking Dead: The Ones Who Live.

Slovis is a member of the American Society of Cinematographers.

== Personal life ==
Slovis currently resides in Montclair, New Jersey with his wife Maria. They have three children.

== Filmography ==
=== Cinematographer ===
==== Film ====
Short film

Year	Title	Director
1989	Coyote Mountain	Jeffrey W. Mueller
1990	The Burning Ghat	James Rasin

Feature film

Year	Title	Director
1994	Heading Home (Note: Also credited as co-producer)	Maria Heritier
1995	Party Girl	Daisy von Scherler Mayer
1995	Malicious	Ian Corson
1995	Breach of Trust	Charles Wilkinson
1998	Scar City	Ken Sanzel
1998	Charlie Hoboken	Thomas F. Mazziotti
1998	The White Raven	Andrew Stevens
1999	Five Aces	David Michael O'Neill
1999	The 4th Floor	Josh Klausner
2002	Half Past Dead	Don Michael Paul

Direct-to-video

Year	Title	Director
1996	Vibrations	Michael Paseornek
1996	Crash Dive	Andrew Stevens
2003	The Foreigner	Michael Oblowitz
2005	The Marksman	Marcus Adams

==== Television ====
TV movies

Year	Title	Director
1996	Angel Flight Down	Charles Wilkinson
1997	Seduction in a Small Town	Charles Wilkinson
1997	Breaking the Surface: The Greg Louganis Story	Steven Hilliard Stern
1997	Out of Nowhere	Charles Wilkinson
1998	Halloweentown	Duwayne Dunham
1999	The Thirteenth Year	Duwayne Dunham
1999	Michael Landon, the Father I Knew	Michael Landon Jr.
2000	Ready to Run	Duwayne Dunham
2009	Exit 19	

TV series

Year	Title	Director	Notes
2004	Ed	Himself	Episode "Pressure Points"
2006–2007	CSI: Crime Scene Investigation	Himself	3 episodes
2008	New Amsterdam		7 episodes
2009	Castle	Rob Bowman	Episode "Flowers for Your Grave"
2009	Fringe	Norberto Barba; Brad Anderson; Bobby Roth	Episodes "Ability", "Unleashed", "Midnight" and "There's More Than One of Everything"
2009	Royal Pains	Don Scardino; Jace Alexander; Constantine Makris	4 episodes
2009–2013	Breaking Bad		48 episodes
2010	Rubicon	Guy Ferland; Jeremy Podeswa	2 episodes
2010	Running Wilde	Alex Hardcastle; Jeff Melman; Scott Ellis	4 episodes
2012	30 Rock	John Riggi; Beth McCarthy-Miller; Jeff Richmond; Michael Engler; Steve Buscemi; Claire Cowperthwaite	11 episodes
2014	The Leftovers	Peter Berg	Episode "Pilot"

=== Director ===
TV series

Year	Title	Director	Executive Producer	Notes
2001	Spirit	Yes	No	TV movie
2004	Ed	Yes	No	Episode "Pressure Points"
2006–2007	CSI: Crime Scene Investigation	Yes	No	3 episodes
2010	Rubicon	Yes	No	Episode "Wayward Sons"
2010–2013	Breaking Bad	Yes	No	Episodes "Kafkaesque", "Cornered", "Live Free or Die" and "Confessions"
2011	Hell on Wheels	Yes	No	Episode "Pride, Pomp and Circumstance"
2011–2018	Law & Order: Special Victims Unit	Yes	No	13 episodes
2012	30 Rock	Yes	No	Episode "Alexis Goodlooking and the Case of the Missing Whisky"
2012–2014	Chicago Fire	Yes	No	4 episodes
2014	Once Upon a Time in Wonderland	Yes	No	Episode "Nothing to Fear"
2014	Chicago P.D.	Yes	No	Episodes "Stepping Stone" and "At Least It's Justice"
2014–2017	Elementary	Yes	No	4 episodes
2015	Game of Thrones	Yes	No	Episodes "The Wars to Come" and "The House of Black and White"
2015	The Man in the High Castle	Yes	No	Episode "Kindness"
2015	The Affair	Yes	No	Episode "211"
2015-2018	The Walking Dead	Yes	No	Episodes "Thank You", "Something They Need", "Worth"
2016	The New Yorker Presents	Yes	No	1 episode
2016	Better Call Saul	Yes	No	Episode "Bali Ha'i"
2016-2018	Preacher	Yes	Yes	7 episodes
2017	The Path	Yes	No	Episodes "The Father and the Son" and "The Red Wall"
2018-2022	New Amsterdam	Yes	Yes	15 episodes
2022	The Calling	Yes	Yes	Episode "Blameless and Upright"
2024	The Walking Dead: Daryl Dixon	Yes	No	Episodes "L'Invisible" and "Vouloir, C'est Pouvoir"
2025	Law & Order: Organized Crime	Yes	Yes	Episodes "Lost Highway" and "Lago D'Averno"

Miniseries

Year	Title	Director	Co-Executive Producer	Notes
2014	Gracepoint	Yes	No	Episode 8
2018	The Looming Tower	Yes	No	Episodes "Boys at War" and "The General"
2024	The Walking Dead: The Ones Who Live	Yes	Yes	Episodes "Bye" and "What We"

== Awards and nominations ==
Year	Award	Category	Title	Episode	Result	Ref.
2006	Primetime Emmy Awards	Outstanding Cinematography	CSI: Crime Scene Investigation	"Gum Drops"	Won	
2007	Primetime Emmy Awards	Outstanding Cinematography	CSI: Crime Scene Investigation	"Built to Kill, Part 1")	Nominated	
2009	Primetime Emmy Awards	Outstanding Cinematography	Breaking Bad	"ABQ"	Nominated	
2010	Primetime Emmy Awards	Outstanding Cinematography	Breaking Bad	"No Más"	Nominated	
2012	Primetime Emmy Awards	Outstanding Cinematography	Breaking Bad	"Face Off"	Nominated	
2013	Primetime Emmy Awards	Outstanding Cinematography	Breaking Bad	"Gliding Over All"	Nominated	
2014	Primetime Emmy Awards	Outstanding Cinematography	Breaking Bad	"Granite State"	Nominated	
