= List of awards and nominations received by Breaking Bad =

Breaking Bad awards and nominations
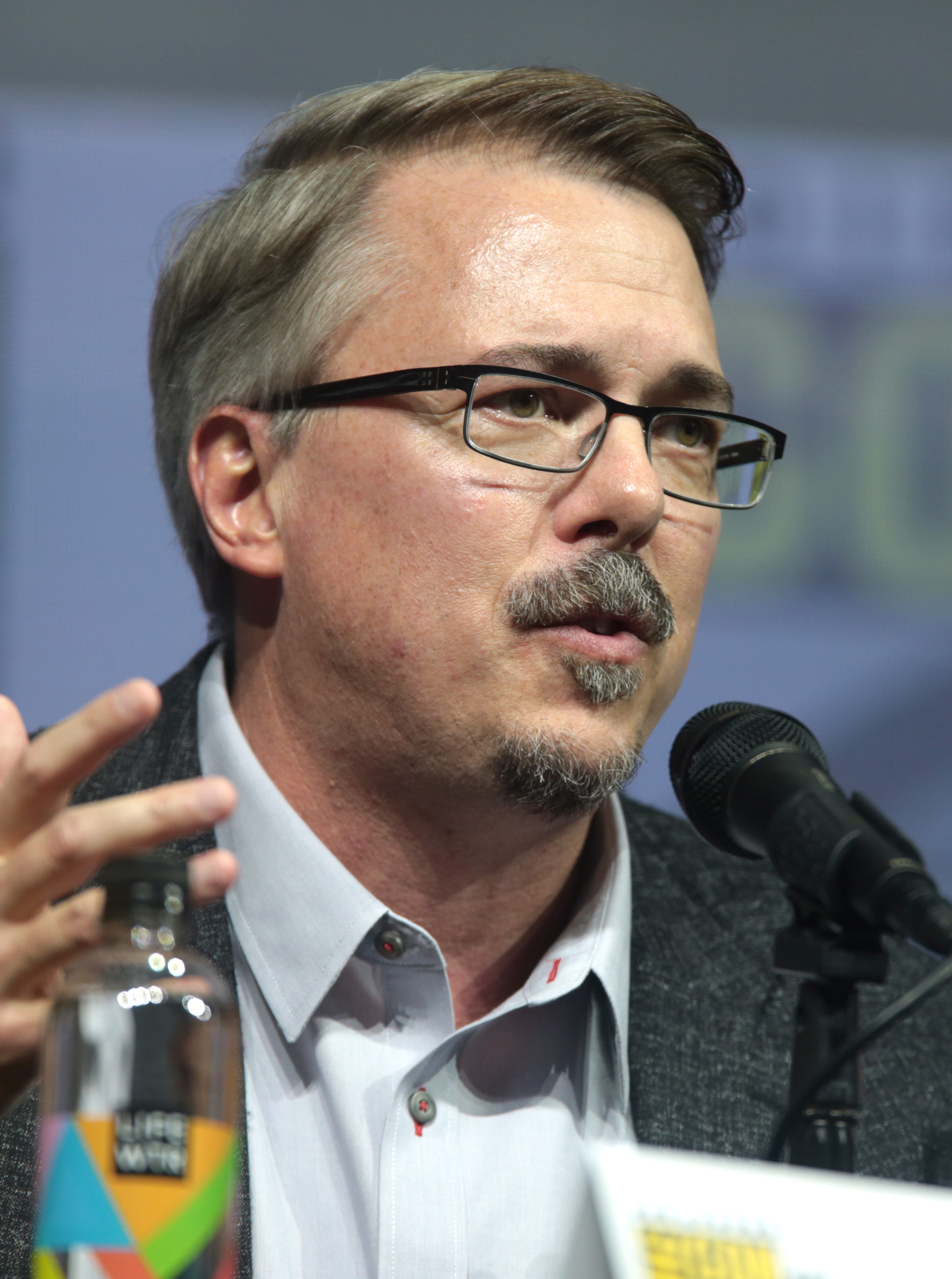
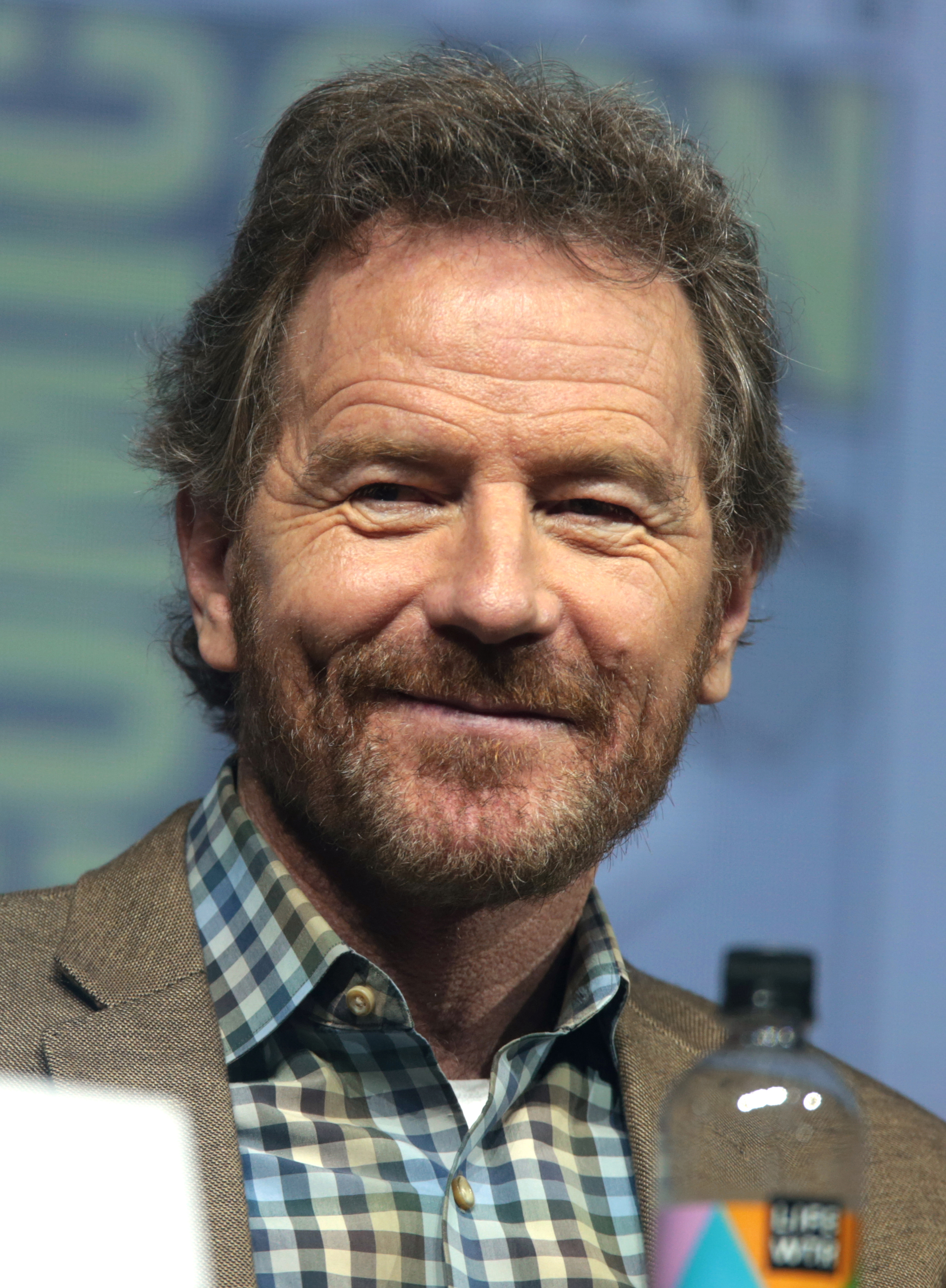
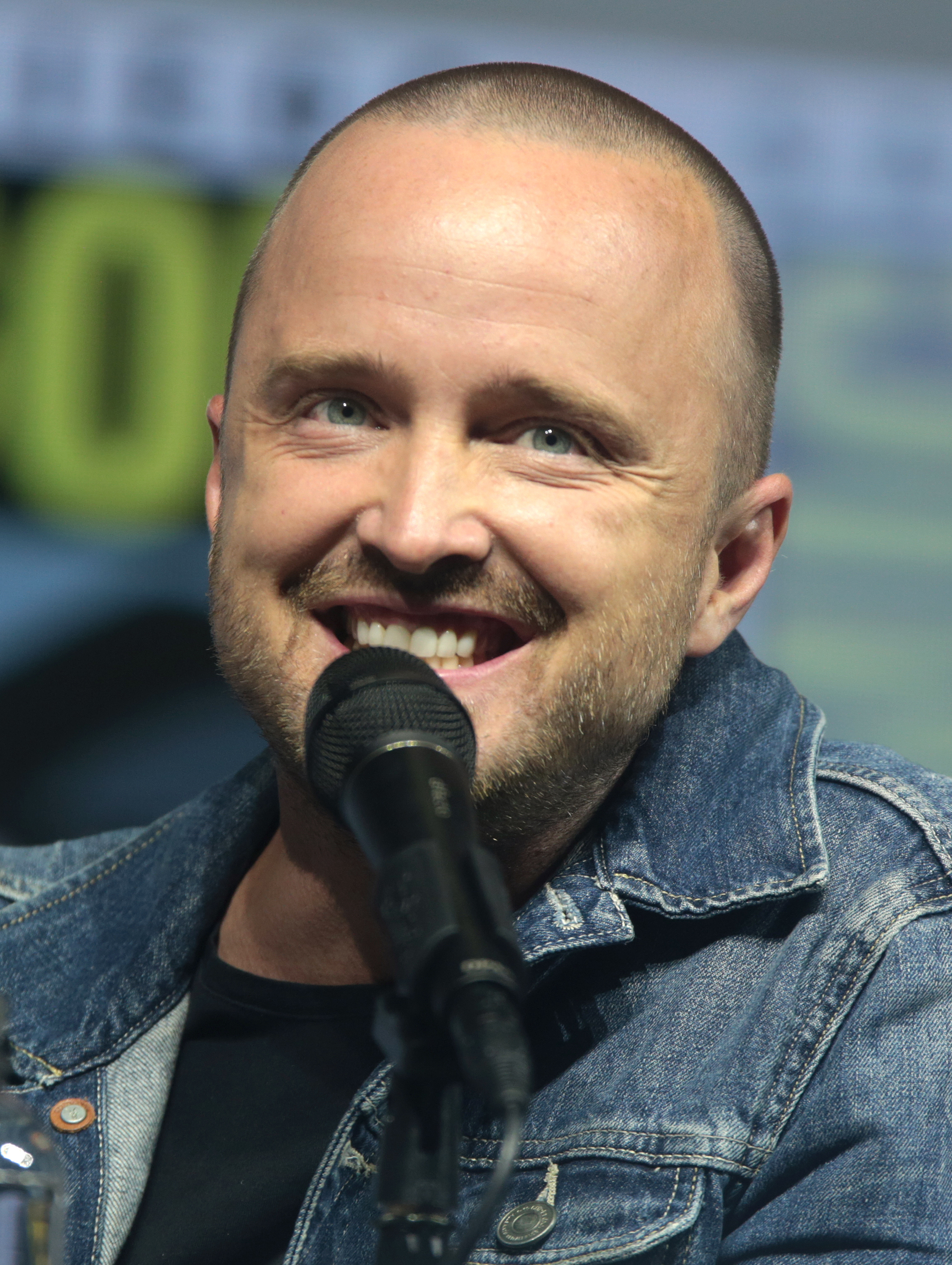
- From left to right: Series creator Vince Gilligan, Bryan Cranston (Walter White), and Aaron Paul (Jesse Pinkman)
Awards and nominations
Award	Wins	Nominations
3D Creative Arts Awards	1	1
American Cinema Editors Awards	5	11
American Film Institute Awards	5	5
Art Directors Guild Awards	0	1
Artios Awards	1	3
ASCAP Film and Television Music Awards	2	2
ASTRA Awards	0	1
British Academy Television Awards	1	2
Cinema Audio Society Awards	0	3
Costume Designers Guild Awards	0	1
Creative Arts Emmy Awards	4	28
Critics' Choice Television Awards	6	13
Directors Guild of America Awards	2	4
Dorian Awards	0	5
Edgar Allan Poe Awards	0	3
Golden Globe Awards	2	7
Golden Nymph Awards	2	3
Golden Reel Awards	1	4
Guild of Music Supervisors Awards	2	4
Hollywood Post Alliance Awards	3	7
Humanitas Prize	0	1
Location Managers Guild Awards	1	3
Magnolia Awards	1	1
Make-Up Artists and Hair Stylists Guild Awards	1	2
NAACP Image Awards	0	1
Peabody Awards	2	2
People's Choice Awards	1	2
Primetime Emmy Awards	12	30
Producers Guild of America Awards	2	5
Satellite Awards	8	16
Saturn Awards	12	27
Screen Actors Guild Awards	3	11
Society of Camera Operators Awards	1	1
TCA Awards	5	16
Visual Effects Society Awards	0	1
Women's Image Network Awards	0	1
Writers Guild of America Awards	6	20

Totals (Note: Certain award groups do not simply award one winner. They acknowledge several different recipients, have runners-up, and have third place. Since this is a specific recognition and is different from losing an award, runner-up mentions are considered wins in this award tally. For simplification and to avoid errors, each award in this list has been presumed to have had a prior nomination.)
- Wins: 92
- Nominations: 248

Breaking Bad is an American television crime drama series created by Vince Gilligan that premiered on AMC on January 20, 2008. Set in Albuquerque, New Mexico, the show follows the life of Walter White (Bryan Cranston), a high school chemistry teacher struggling with stage-three lung cancer who decides to produce and distribute crystal meth with his former student Jesse Pinkman (Aaron Paul) to secure his family's financial future. Concurrently, his wife Skyler (Anna Gunn) grows suspicious and his brother-in-law and DEA agent Hank Schrader (Dean Norris) begins to investigate. After five seasons and a total of 62 episodes, the series concluded on September 29, 2013.

Upon its release, Breaking Bad became one of the highest-rated shows on network television and received universal acclaim, with particular praise for its acting, characters, writing, direction, and cinematography; (Note: Season-by-season reception: The first season holds an 86% approval rating based on 42 reviews on Rotten Tomatoes and a score of 73 based on 27 reviews on Metacritic.; The second season holds a 97% approval rating based on 35 reviews on Rotten Tomatoes and a score of 84 based on 19 reviews on Metacritic.; The third season holds a 100% approval rating based on 35 reviews on Rotten Tomatoes and a score of 89 based on 15 reviews on Metacritic.; The fourth season holds a 100% approval rating based on 34 reviews on Rotten Tomatoes and a score of 96 based on 15 reviews on Metacritic.; The fifth season holds a 97% approval rating based on 97 reviews on Rotten Tomatoes and a score of 99 based on 22 reviews on Metacritic.) it entered the Guinness World Records in 2014 as the most critically acclaimed show of all time. Its impact on television resulted in the creation of the spin-off series Better Call Saul, centered on the character of Saul Goodman (Bob Odenkirk), and a sequel released in 2019 as El Camino: A Breaking Bad Movie, both of which also received positive reviews.

The series has been nominated for numerous accolades, winning five American Film Institute awards for Television Program of the Year. For his performance, Cranston was nominated for four consecutive Golden Globes (winning once) and won four Primetime Emmy Awards for Best Lead Actor in a Drama Series. Meanwhile, Paul earned one Golden Globe nomination and won three Emmys for Outstanding Supporting Actor in a Drama Series. Gunn also received several award nominations and won two consecutive Emmys for Outstanding Supporting Actress in a Drama Series.

Also serving as a producer and director, Gilligan was awarded the Writers Guild of America Award for Episodic Drama twice for writing the pilot episode and "Box Cutter". For his portrayal of Gus Fring, Giancarlo Esposito won a Critics' Choice Television Award for Best Supporting Actor in a Drama Series. Robert Forster, who guest-starred as Ed Galbraith, was awarded a Saturn Award for Best Guest Starring Role on Television. Cinematographer Michael Slovis and editors Lynne Willingham and Skip Macdonald were also given award nominations and each earned at least one Emmy nomination for their work on Breaking Bad.

The series has received numerous award nominations from entertainment guilds, including four Directors Guild of America Award nominations, with Gilligan and Rian Johnson both winning one award for Outstanding Directing in a Drama Series; five nominations from the Producers Guild of America Awards (winning two); eleven nominations from the Actor Awards (winning three); and twenty nominations from the Writers Guild of America Awards (winning six). The series also received thirteen Critics' Choice Television Award nominations (winning six), sixteen TCA Award nominations (winning five), twenty-seven Saturn Award nominations (winning twelve), and fifty-eight Emmy nominations (winning sixteen). For its narrative and storytelling execution, Breaking Bad has been named one of the greatest television series of all time.

== Awards and nominations ==
Awards and nominations received by Breaking Bad
Award	Year (Note: The listed year refers to the date of the ceremony, not necessarily the year in which the corresponding season or episode aired.)	Category	Nominee(s)	Result	Ref.
3D Creative Arts Awards	2014	Best 4K Lumiere – Entertainment	Breaking Bad	Won	
American Cinema Editors Awards	2009	Best Edited One-Hour Series for Commercial Television	Lynne Willingham (for "Pilot")	Won	
American Cinema Editors Awards	2010	Best Edited One-Hour Series for Commercial Television	Lynne Willingham (for "ABQ")	Won	
American Cinema Editors Awards	2011	Best Edited One-Hour Series for Commercial Television	Kelley Dixon (for "Sunset")	Nominated	
American Cinema Editors Awards	2012	Best Edited One-Hour Series for Commercial Television	Skip Macdonald (for "Face Off")	Won	
American Cinema Editors Awards	2012	Best Edited One-Hour Series for Commercial Television	Kelley Dixon (for "End Times")	Nominated	
American Cinema Editors Awards	2013	Best Edited One-Hour Series for Commercial Television	Skip Macdonald (for "Dead Freight")	Won	
American Cinema Editors Awards	2013	Best Edited One-Hour Series for Commercial Television	Kelley Dixon (for "Gliding Over All")	Nominated	
American Cinema Editors Awards	2014	Best Edited One-Hour Series for Commercial Television	Skip Macdonald (for "Felina")	Won	
American Cinema Editors Awards	2014	Best Edited One-Hour Series for Commercial Television	Kelley Dixon and Chris McCaleb (for "Granite State")	Nominated	
American Cinema Editors Awards	2014	Best Edited One-Hour Series for Commercial Television	Skip Macdonald (for "Ozymandias")	Nominated	
American Cinema Editors Awards	2014	Best Edited One-Hour Series for Commercial Television	Skip Macdonald and Sharidan Williams-Sotelo (for "Buried")	Nominated	
American Film Institute Awards	2008	Television Programs of the Year	Breaking Bad	Won (Note: This award does not have a single winner, but recognizes multiple series.)	
American Film Institute Awards	2010	Television Programs of the Year	Breaking Bad	Won	
American Film Institute Awards	2011	Television Programs of the Year	Breaking Bad	Won	
American Film Institute Awards	2012	Television Programs of the Year	Breaking Bad	Won	
American Film Institute Awards	2013	Television Programs of the Year	Breaking Bad	Won	
Art Directors Guild Awards	2014	One-Hour Single-Camera Television Series	Mark Freeborn (for "Felina") (Note: Additional nominees: Paula Dal Santo (art director), Billy W. Ray (assistant art director), Derek Jensen (set designer), Derrick Ballard (set designer), Joanna Maes-Corlew (graphic designer), and Michael Flowers (set decorator))	Nominated	
Artios Awards	2010	Outstanding Achievement in Casting – Television Series – Drama	Sharon Bialy and Sherry Thomas	Nominated	
Artios Awards	2012	Outstanding Achievement in Casting – Television Series – Drama	Sharon Bialy, Sherry Thomas, Rody Kent, and Russell Scott	Nominated	
Artios Awards	2015	Outstanding Achievement in Casting – Television Series – Drama	Sharon Bialy, Sherry Thomas, Kiira Arai, and Russell Scott	Won	
ASCAP Film and Television Music Awards	2011	Best Television Composer	Dave Porter	Won	
ASCAP Film and Television Music Awards	2014	Composers' Choice Award	Dave Porter	Won	
ASTRA Awards	2012	Favourite Program – International Drama	Breaking Bad	Nominated	
British Academy Television Awards	2014	Best International Programme	Breaking Bad	Won	
British Academy Television Awards	2014	Radio Times Audience Award	Breaking Bad	Nominated	
Cinema Audio Society Awards	2012	Outstanding Achievement in Sound Mixing for Television Series – One Hour	Darryl L. Frank, Jeffery Perkins, and Eric Justen (for "Face Off")	Nominated	
Cinema Audio Society Awards	2013	Outstanding Achievement in Sound Mixing for Television Series – One Hour	Darryl L. Frank, Jeff Perkins, Eric Justen, Eric Gotthelf, and Stacey Michaels (for "Dead Freight")	Nominated	
Cinema Audio Society Awards	2014	Outstanding Achievement in Sound Mixing for Television Series – One Hour	Darryl L. Frank, Jeff Perkins, Eric Justen, and Kathryn Madsen (for "Felina")	Nominated	
Costume Designers Guild Awards	2014	Outstanding Contemporary Television Series	Jennifer L. Bryan	Nominated	
Creative Arts Emmy Awards	2008	Outstanding Cinematography for a Single-Camera Series (One Hour)	John Toll (for "Pilot")	Nominated	
Creative Arts Emmy Awards	2008	Outstanding Single-Camera Picture Editing for a Drama Series	Lynne Willingham (for "Pilot")	Won	
Creative Arts Emmy Awards	2009	Outstanding Cinematography for a Single-Camera Series (One Hour)	Michael Slovis (for "ABQ")	Nominated	
Creative Arts Emmy Awards	2009	Outstanding Single-Camera Picture Editing for a Drama Series	Lynne Willingham (for "ABQ")	Won	
Creative Arts Emmy Awards	2010	Outstanding Cinematography for a Single-Camera Series (One Hour)	Michael Slovis (for "No Más")	Nominated	
Creative Arts Emmy Awards	2010	Outstanding Single-Camera Picture Editing for a Drama Series	Skip Macdonald (for "No Más")	Nominated	
Creative Arts Emmy Awards	2010	Outstanding Sound Editing for a Comedy or Drama Series (One-Hour)	Kurt Nicholas Forshager, Kathryn Madsen, Mark Cookson, Cormac Funge, Jane Boegel, Jason Tregoe Newman, Gregg Barbanell, and Dominique Decaudain (for "One Minute")	Nominated	
Creative Arts Emmy Awards	2012	Outstanding Guest Actor in a Drama Series	Mark Margolis (for "Face Off")	Nominated	
Creative Arts Emmy Awards	2012	Outstanding Cinematography for a Single-Camera Series (One Hour)	Michael Slovis (for "Face Off")	Nominated	
Creative Arts Emmy Awards	2012	Outstanding Single-Camera Picture Editing for a Drama Series	Kelley Dixon (for "End Times")	Nominated	
Creative Arts Emmy Awards	2012	Outstanding Single-Camera Picture Editing for a Drama Series	Skip Macdonald (for "Face Off")	Nominated	
Creative Arts Emmy Awards	2012	Outstanding Sound Editing for a Comedy or Drama Series (One-Hour)	Kurt Nicholas Forshager, Jason Tregoe Newman, Kathryn Madsen, Mark Cookson, Cormac Funge, Jane Boegel, Jeffrey Cranford, Dominique Decaudain, and Gregg Barbanell (for "Face Off")	Nominated	
Creative Arts Emmy Awards	2012	Outstanding Sound Mixing for a Comedy or Drama Series (One-Hour)	Darryl L. Frank, Jeffrey Perkins, and Eric Justen (for "Face Off")	Nominated	
Creative Arts Emmy Awards	2012	Outstanding Special Visual Effects in a Supporting Role	William Powloski, Greg Nicotero, Bruce Branit, Werner Hahnlein, Steve Fong, Sean Joseph, Matthew Perin (for "Face Off")	Nominated	
Creative Arts Emmy Awards	2013	Outstanding Cinematography for a Single-Camera Series (One Hour)	Michael Slovis (for "Gliding Over All")	Nominated	
Creative Arts Emmy Awards	2013	Outstanding Single-Camera Picture Editing for a Drama Series	Kelley Dixon (for "Gliding Over All")	Won	
Creative Arts Emmy Awards	2013	Outstanding Single-Camera Picture Editing for a Drama Series	Skip Macdonald (for "Dead Freight")	Nominated	
Creative Arts Emmy Awards	2013	Outstanding Sound Editing for a Comedy or Drama Series (One-Hour)	Kurt Nicholas Forshager, Kathryn Madsen, Jane Boegel, Mark Cookson, Cormac Funge, Jason Tregoe Newman, Jeffrey Cranford, Gregg Barbanell, and Dominique Decaudain (for "Dead Freight")	Nominated	
Creative Arts Emmy Awards	2013	Outstanding Sound Mixing for a Comedy or Drama Series (One-Hour)	Darryl L. Frank, Jeffrey Perkins, and Eric Justen (for "Dead Freight")	Nominated	
Creative Arts Emmy Awards	2014	Outstanding Casting for a Drama Series	Sharon Bialy, Sherry Thomas, and Kiira Arai	Nominated	
Creative Arts Emmy Awards	2014	Outstanding Cinematography for a Single-Camera Series (One Hour)	Michael Slovis (for "Granite State")	Nominated	
Creative Arts Emmy Awards	2014	Outstanding Single-Camera Picture Editing for a Drama Series	Skip Macdonald (for "Felina")	Won	
Creative Arts Emmy Awards	2014	Outstanding Single-Camera Picture Editing for a Drama Series	Kelley Dixon (for "To'hajiilee")	Nominated	
Creative Arts Emmy Awards	2014	Outstanding Single-Camera Picture Editing for a Drama Series	Kelley Dixon and Chris McCaleb (for "Granite State")	Nominated	
Creative Arts Emmy Awards	2014	Outstanding Sound Editing for a Comedy or Drama Series (One-Hour)	Kurt Nicholas Forshager, Kathryn Madsen, Jason Tregoe Newman, Mark Cookson, Cormac Funge, Jane Boegel, Jeffrey Cranford, Tim Boggs, Gregg Barbanell, and Dominique Decaudain (for "Felina")	Nominated	
Creative Arts Emmy Awards	2014	Outstanding Sound Mixing for a Comedy or Drama Series (One-Hour)	Darryl L. Frank, Jeffrey Perkins, and Eric Justen (for "Felina")	Nominated	
Creative Arts Emmy Awards	2014	Outstanding Makeup for a Single-Camera Series (Non-Prosthetic)	Tarra D. Day and Corey Welk (for "Ozymandias")	Nominated	
Creative Arts Emmy Awards	2014	Outstanding Prosthetic Makeup for a Series, Limited Series, Movie or Special	Greg Nicotero, Howard Berger, Tarra D. Day, Stephan Dupuis, and Steve LaPorte (for "Felina")	Nominated	
Critics' Choice Television Awards	2012	Best Drama Series	Breaking Bad	Nominated	
Critics' Choice Television Awards	2012	Best Actor in a Drama Series	Bryan Cranston	Won	
Critics' Choice Television Awards	2012	Best Supporting Actor in a Drama Series	Giancarlo Esposito	Won	
Critics' Choice Television Awards	2012	Best Supporting Actor in a Drama Series	Aaron Paul	Nominated	
Critics' Choice Television Awards	2012	Best Supporting Actress in a Drama Series	Anna Gunn	Nominated	
Critics' Choice Television Awards	2013	Best Drama Series	Breaking Bad	Won (Note: Tied with Game of Thrones)	
Critics' Choice Television Awards	2013	Best Actor in a Drama Series	Bryan Cranston	Won	
Critics' Choice Television Awards	2013	Best Supporting Actor in a Drama Series	Jonathan Banks	Nominated	
Critics' Choice Television Awards	2013	Best Supporting Actress in a Drama Series	Anna Gunn	Nominated	
Critics' Choice Television Awards	2014	Best Drama Series	Breaking Bad	Won	
Critics' Choice Television Awards	2014	Best Actor in a Drama Series	Bryan Cranston	Nominated	
Critics' Choice Television Awards	2014	Best Supporting Actor in a Drama Series	Aaron Paul	Won	
Critics' Choice Television Awards	2014	Best Supporting Actress in a Drama Series	Anna Gunn	Nominated	
Directors Guild of America Awards	2012	Outstanding Directing – Drama Series	Vince Gilligan (for "Face Off")	Nominated	
Directors Guild of America Awards	2013	Outstanding Directing – Drama Series	Rian Johnson (for "Fifty-One") (Note: Additional nominees: Stewart A. Lyons (unit production manager), James Paul Hapsas (assistant unit production manager), Ben Scissors (first assistant director), Louis Lanni (second assistant director), Anna Ramey (second second assistant director), and Joann Connolly (additional second assistant director))	Won	
Directors Guild of America Awards	2014	Outstanding Directing – Drama Series	Vince Gilligan (for "Felina") (Note: Additional nominees: Stewart A. Lyons (unit production manager), James Paul Hapsas (assistant unit production manager), Nina Jack (first assistant director), Anna Ramey (second assistant director), Louis Lanni (second assistant director), Joann Connolly (second second assistant director), and Marcia Woske (additional second assistant director))	Won	
Directors Guild of America Awards	2014	Outstanding Directing – Drama Series	Bryan Cranston (for "Blood Money") (Note: Additional nominees: Stewart A. Lyons (unit production manager), James Paul Hapsas (assistant unit production manager), Nina Jack (first assistant director), Louis Lanni (second assistant director), Anna Ramey (second second assistant director), and Marcia Woske (additional second assistant director))	Nominated	
Dorian Awards	2012	TV Performance of the Year – Actor	Bryan Cranston	Nominated	
Dorian Awards	2013	TV Drama of the Year	Breaking Bad	Nominated	
Dorian Awards	2013	TV Performance of the Year – Actor	Aaron Paul	Nominated	
Dorian Awards	2014	TV Drama of the Year	Breaking Bad	Nominated	
Dorian Awards	2014	TV Performance of the Year – Actor	Bryan Cranston	Nominated	
Edgar Allan Poe Awards	2010	Best Television Episode Teleplay	George Mastras (for "Grilled")	Nominated	
Edgar Allan Poe Awards	2011	Best Television Episode Teleplay	Vince Gilligan (for "Full Measure")	Nominated	
Edgar Allan Poe Awards	2011	Best Television Episode Teleplay	Vince Gilligan (for "No Más")	Nominated	
Golden Globe Awards	2011	Best Actor – Television Series Drama	Bryan Cranston	Nominated	
Golden Globe Awards	2012	Best Actor – Television Series Drama	Bryan Cranston	Nominated	
Golden Globe Awards	2013	Best Television Series – Drama	Breaking Bad	Nominated	
Golden Globe Awards	2013	Best Actor – Television Series Drama	Bryan Cranston	Nominated	
Golden Globe Awards	2014	Best Television Series – Drama	Breaking Bad	Won	
Golden Globe Awards	2014	Best Actor – Television Series Drama	Bryan Cranston	Won	
Golden Globe Awards	2014	Best Supporting Actor – Series, Miniseries or Television Film	Aaron Paul	Nominated	
Golden Nymph Awards	2013	Best Drama TV Series	Breaking Bad	Won	
Golden Nymph Awards	2013	Outstanding Actor in a Drama Series	Bryan Cranston	Won	
Golden Nymph Awards	2013	Outstanding Actress in a Drama Series	Anna Gunn	Nominated	
Golden Reel Awards	2011	Outstanding Achievement in Sound Editing – Sound Effects and Foley for Episodic Short Form Broadcast Media	Breaking Bad (for "One Minute")	Nominated	
Golden Reel Awards	2012	Outstanding Achievement in Sound Editing – Sound Effects and Foley for Episodic Short Form Broadcast Media	Kurt Nicholas Forshager, Gregg Barbanell, Dominique Decaudain, Mark Cookson, Cormac Funge, and Jeffrey Cranford (for "Face Off")	Nominated	
Golden Reel Awards	2014	Outstanding Achievement in Sound Editing – Sound Effects and Foley for Episodic Short Form Broadcast Media	Kurt Nicholas Forshager, Gregg Barbanell, Dominique Decaudain, Mark Cookson, Cormac Funge, Tim Boggs, and Jeffrey Cranford (for "Felina")	Won	
Golden Reel Awards	2014	Outstanding Achievement in Sound Editing – Dialogue and ADR for Episodic Short Form Broadcast Media	Kurt Nicholas Forshager and Kathryn Madsen (for "To'hajiilee")	Nominated	
Guild of Music Supervisors Awards	2011	Best Music Supervision for a Television	Thomas Golubić (Note: Also nominated for The Walking Dead and Rubicon)	Nominated	
Guild of Music Supervisors Awards	2012	Best Music Supervision for a Television Drama	Thomas Golubić (Note: Also nominated for The Walking Dead and The Killing)	Nominated	
Guild of Music Supervisors Awards	2013	Best Music Supervision for a Television Drama	Thomas Golubić	Won	
Guild of Music Supervisors Awards	2014	Best Music Supervision for a Television Drama	Thomas Golubić	Won	
Hollywood Post Alliance Awards	2008	Outstanding Editing – Television (Over 30 Minutes)	Lynne Willingham (for "Pilot")	Nominated	
Hollywood Post Alliance Awards	2009	Outstanding Editing – Television (Over 30 Minutes)	Lynne Willingham (for "ABQ")	Won	
Hollywood Post Alliance Awards	2011	Outstanding Color Grading – Television	Tom Sartori (for "Box Cutter")	Nominated	
Hollywood Post Alliance Awards	2012	Outstanding Editing – Television (Over 30 Minutes)	Skip Macdonald (for "Face Off")	Nominated	
Hollywood Post Alliance Awards	2013	Outstanding Editing – Television (Over 30 Minutes)	Skip Macdonald (for "Dead Freight")	Won	
Hollywood Post Alliance Awards	2013	Outstanding Editing – Television (Over 30 Minutes)	Kelley Dixon (for "Gliding Over All")	Nominated	
Hollywood Post Alliance Awards	2014	Outstanding Editing – Television (Over 30 Minutes)	Skip Macdonald (for "Felina")	Won	
Humanitas Prize	2010	60 Minute Network or Syndicated Television	J. Roberts and Vince Gilligan (for "Peekaboo")	Nominated	
Location Managers Guild Awards	2014	Outstanding Achievement in Television	Christian Diaz de Bedoya	Nominated	
Location Managers Guild Awards	2014	Outstanding Film Commission	Albuquerque Film Commission (Note: Also nominated for Lone Survivor (2013))	Won	
Location Managers Guild Awards	2014	Outstanding Locations in Television	Breaking Bad	Nominated	
Magnolia Awards	2014	Best Foreign TV Series	Breaking Bad	Won	
Make-Up Artists and Hair Stylists Guild Awards	2014	Best Contemporary Makeup in Television and New Media Series	Tarra D. Day and Steve La Porte	Won	
Make-Up Artists and Hair Stylists Guild Awards	2014	Best Contemporary Hair Styling in Television and New Media Series	Geordie Sheffer and Carmen L. Jones	Nominated	
NAACP Image Awards	2011	Outstanding Supporting Actor in a Drama Series	Giancarlo Esposito	Nominated	
Peabody Awards	2008	Honoree	Breaking Bad	Won	
Peabody Awards	2014	Honoree	Breaking Bad	Won	
People's Choice Awards	2014	Favorite Series We Miss Most	Breaking Bad	Won	
People's Choice Awards	2014	Favorite TV Anti-Hero	Walter White	Nominated	
Primetime Emmy Awards	2008	Outstanding Lead Actor in a Drama Series	Bryan Cranston (for "Pilot")	Won	
Primetime Emmy Awards	2008	Outstanding Directing for a Drama Series	Vince Gilligan (for "Pilot")	Nominated	
Primetime Emmy Awards	2009	Outstanding Drama Series	Breaking Bad	Nominated	
Primetime Emmy Awards	2009	Outstanding Lead Actor in a Drama Series	Bryan Cranston (for "Phoenix")	Won	
Primetime Emmy Awards	2009	Outstanding Supporting Actor in a Drama Series	Aaron Paul (for "Peekaboo")	Nominated	
Primetime Emmy Awards	2010	Outstanding Drama Series	Breaking Bad	Nominated	
Primetime Emmy Awards	2010	Outstanding Lead Actor in a Drama Series	Bryan Cranston (for "Full Measure")	Won	
Primetime Emmy Awards	2010	Outstanding Supporting Actor in a Drama Series	Aaron Paul (for "Half Measures")	Won	
Primetime Emmy Awards	2010	Outstanding Directing for a Drama Series	Michelle MacLaren (for "One Minute")	Nominated	
Primetime Emmy Awards	2012	Outstanding Drama Series	Breaking Bad	Nominated	
Primetime Emmy Awards	2012	Outstanding Lead Actor in a Drama Series	Bryan Cranston (for "Crawl Space")	Nominated	
Primetime Emmy Awards	2012	Outstanding Supporting Actor in a Drama Series	Aaron Paul (for "End Times")	Won	
Primetime Emmy Awards	2012	Outstanding Supporting Actor in a Drama Series	Giancarlo Esposito (for "Hermanos")	Nominated	
Primetime Emmy Awards	2012	Outstanding Supporting Actress in a Drama Series	Anna Gunn (for "Cornered")	Nominated	
Primetime Emmy Awards	2012	Outstanding Directing for a Drama Series	Vince Gilligan (for "Face Off")	Nominated	
Primetime Emmy Awards	2013	Outstanding Drama Series	Breaking Bad	Won	
Primetime Emmy Awards	2013	Outstanding Lead Actor in a Drama Series	Bryan Cranston (for "Say My Name")	Nominated	
Primetime Emmy Awards	2013	Outstanding Supporting Actor in a Drama Series	Aaron Paul (for "Buyout")	Nominated	
Primetime Emmy Awards	2013	Outstanding Supporting Actor in a Drama Series	Jonathan Banks (for "Say My Name")	Nominated	
Primetime Emmy Awards	2013	Outstanding Supporting Actress in a Drama Series	Anna Gunn (for "Fifty-One")	Won	
Primetime Emmy Awards	2013	Outstanding Directing for a Drama Series	Michelle MacLaren (for "Gliding Over All")	Nominated	
Primetime Emmy Awards	2013	Outstanding Writing for a Drama Series	George Mastras (for "Dead Freight")	Nominated	
Primetime Emmy Awards	2013	Outstanding Writing for a Drama Series	Thomas Schnauz (for "Say My Name")	Nominated	
Primetime Emmy Awards	2014	Outstanding Drama Series	Breaking Bad	Won	
Primetime Emmy Awards	2014	Outstanding Lead Actor in a Drama Series	Bryan Cranston (for "Ozymandias")	Won	
Primetime Emmy Awards	2014	Outstanding Supporting Actor in a Drama Series	Aaron Paul (for "Confessions")	Won	
Primetime Emmy Awards	2014	Outstanding Supporting Actress in a Drama Series	Anna Gunn (for "Ozymandias")	Won	
Primetime Emmy Awards	2014	Outstanding Directing for a Drama Series	Vince Gilligan (for "Felina")	Nominated	
Primetime Emmy Awards	2014	Outstanding Writing for a Drama Series	Moira Walley-Beckett (for "Ozymandias")	Won	
Primetime Emmy Awards	2014	Outstanding Writing for a Drama Series	Vince Gilligan (for "Felina")	Nominated	
Producers Guild of America Awards	2010	Outstanding Producer of Episodic Television, Drama	Vince Gilligan, Mark Johnson, Melissa Bernstein, Stewart Lyons, and Karen Moore	Nominated	
Producers Guild of America Awards	2011	Outstanding Producer of Episodic Television, Drama	Melissa Bernstein, Vince Gilligan, Mark Johnson, Stewart Lyons, and Michelle MacLaren	Nominated	
Producers Guild of America Awards	2013	Outstanding Producer of Episodic Television, Drama	Diane Mercer, Stewart Lyons, Mark Johnson, Peter Gould, Bryan Cranston, Melissa Bernstein, Michelle MacLaren, Thomas Schnauz, George Mastras, Vince Gilligan, and Moira Walley-Beckett	Nominated	
Producers Guild of America Awards	2014	Outstanding Producer of Episodic Television, Drama	Melissa Bernstein, Sam Catlin, Bryan Cranston, Vince Gilligan, Peter Gould, Mark Johnson, Stewart Lyons, Michelle MacLaren, George Mastras, Diane Mercer, Thomas Schnauz, and Moira Walley-Beckett	Won	
Producers Guild of America Awards	2015	Outstanding Producer of Episodic Television, Drama	Melissa Bernstein, Sam Catlin, Bryan Cranston, Vince Gilligan, Peter Gould, Mark Johnson, Stewart Lyons, Michelle MacLaren, George Mastras, Diane Mercer, Thomas Schnauz, and Moira Walley-Beckett	Won	
Satellite Awards	2008	Best Actor – Television Series Drama	Bryan Cranston	Won	
Satellite Awards	2009	Best Television Series – Drama	Breaking Bad	Won	
Satellite Awards	2009	Best Actor – Television Series Drama	Bryan Cranston	Won	
Satellite Awards	2010	Best Television Series – Drama	Breaking Bad	Won	
Satellite Awards	2010	Best Actor – Television Series Drama	Bryan Cranston	Won	
Satellite Awards	2010	Best Supporting Actor – Series, Miniseries or Television Film	Aaron Paul	Nominated	
Satellite Awards	2011	Best Television Series – Drama	Breaking Bad	Nominated	
Satellite Awards	2011	Best Actor – Television Series Drama	Bryan Cranston	Nominated	
Satellite Awards	2012	Best Television Series – Drama	Breaking Bad	Nominated	
Satellite Awards	2012	Best Actor – Television Series Drama	Bryan Cranston	Nominated	
Satellite Awards	2012	Best Supporting Actor – Series, Miniseries or Television Film	Giancarlo Esposito	Nominated	
Satellite Awards	2014	Best Television Series – Drama	Breaking Bad	Won	
Satellite Awards	2014	Best Actor – Television Series Drama	Bryan Cranston	Won	
Satellite Awards	2014	Best Supporting Actor – Series, Miniseries or Television Film	Aaron Paul	Won	
Satellite Awards	2014	Best Supporting Actress – Series, Miniseries or Television Film	Anna Gunn	Nominated	
Satellite Awards	2014	Outstanding Overall Blu-Ray	Breaking Bad: The Complete Series	Nominated	
Saturn Awards	2009	Best Television Presentation	Breaking Bad	Nominated	
Saturn Awards	2009	Best Actor on Television	Bryan Cranston	Nominated	
Saturn Awards	2010	Best Syndicated/Cable Television Series	Breaking Bad	Won	
Saturn Awards	2010	Best Actor on Television	Bryan Cranston	Nominated	
Saturn Awards	2010	Best Actress on Television	Anna Gunn	Nominated	
Saturn Awards	2010	Best Supporting Actor on Television	Aaron Paul	Won	
Saturn Awards	2010	Best Guest Performance in a Television Series	Raymond Cruz	Nominated	
Saturn Awards	2011	Best Syndicated/Cable Television Series	Breaking Bad	Won	
Saturn Awards	2011	Best Actor on Television	Bryan Cranston	Nominated	
Saturn Awards	2011	Best Supporting Actor on Television	Dean Norris	Nominated	
Saturn Awards	2011	Best Supporting Actor on Television	Aaron Paul	Nominated	
Saturn Awards	2011	Best Guest Performance in a Television Series	Giancarlo Esposito	Nominated	
Saturn Awards	2012	Best Syndicated/Cable Television Series	Breaking Bad	Won	
Saturn Awards	2012	Best Actor on Television	Bryan Cranston	Won	
Saturn Awards	2012	Best Supporting Actor on Television	Aaron Paul	Won	
Saturn Awards	2012	Best Supporting Actor on Television	Giancarlo Esposito	Nominated	
Saturn Awards	2012	Best Guest Performance in a Television Series	Steven Bauer	Nominated	
Saturn Awards	2012	Best Guest Performance in a Television Series	Mark Margolis	Nominated	
Saturn Awards	2013	Best Television Presentation	Breaking Bad	Won	
Saturn Awards	2013	Best Actor on Television	Bryan Cranston	Won (Note: Tied with Kevin Bacon from The Following)	
Saturn Awards	2013	Best Supporting Actor on Television	Jonathan Banks	Won	
Saturn Awards	2013	Best Supporting Actress on Television	Anna Gunn	Nominated	
Saturn Awards	2014	Best Television Presentation	Breaking Bad	Won	
Saturn Awards	2014	Best Actor on Television	Bryan Cranston	Nominated	
Saturn Awards	2014	Best Actress on Television	Anna Gunn	Nominated	
Saturn Awards	2014	Best Supporting Actor on Television	Aaron Paul	Won	
Saturn Awards	2014	Best Guest Performance in a Television Series	Robert Forster	Won	
Screen Actors Guild Awards	2010	Outstanding Performance by a Male Actor in a Drama Series	Bryan Cranston	Nominated	
Screen Actors Guild Awards	2011	Outstanding Performance by a Male Actor in a Drama Series	Bryan Cranston	Nominated	
Screen Actors Guild Awards	2012	Outstanding Performance by a Male Actor in a Drama Series	Bryan Cranston	Nominated	
Screen Actors Guild Awards	2012	Outstanding Performance by an Ensemble in a Drama Series	Jonathan Banks, Betsy Brandt, Ray Campbell, Bryan Cranston, Giancarlo Esposito, Anna Gunn, RJ Mitte, Dean Norris, Bob Odenkirk, and Aaron Paul	Nominated	
Screen Actors Guild Awards	2013	Outstanding Performance by a Male Actor in a Drama Series	Bryan Cranston	Won	
Screen Actors Guild Awards	2013	Outstanding Performance by an Ensemble in a Drama Series	Jonathan Banks, Betsy Brandt, Bryan Cranston, Laura Fraser, Anna Gunn, RJ Mitte, Dean Norris, Bob Odenkirk, Aaron Paul, Jesse Plemons, and Steven Michael Quezada	Nominated	
Screen Actors Guild Awards	2013	Outstanding Performance by a Stunt Ensemble in a Television Series	Laurence Chavez, Al Goto, Larry Rippenkroeger, and Jimmy Romano	Nominated	
Screen Actors Guild Awards	2014	Outstanding Performance by a Male Actor in a Drama Series	Bryan Cranston	Won	
Screen Actors Guild Awards	2014	Outstanding Performance by a Female Actor in a Drama Series	Anna Gunn	Nominated	
Screen Actors Guild Awards	2014	Outstanding Performance by an Ensemble in a Drama Series	Michael Bowen, Betsy Brandt, Bryan Cranston, Lavell Crawford, Tait Fletcher, Laura Fraser, Anna Gunn, Matthew T. Metzler, RJ Mitte, Dean Norris, Bob Odenkirk, Aaron Paul, Jesse Plemons, Steven Michael Quezada, Kevin Rankin, and Patrick Sane	Won	
Screen Actors Guild Awards	2014	Outstanding Performance by a Stunt Ensemble in a Television Series	Laurence Chavez, Ed Duran, Glenn Foster, Al Goto, and Larry Rippenkroeger	Nominated	
Society of Camera Operators Awards	2013	Camera Operator of the Year in Television	Andrew Voegeli	Won	
TCA Awards	2008	Outstanding New Program	Breaking Bad	Nominated	
TCA Awards	2009	Outstanding Achievement in Drama	Breaking Bad	Nominated	
TCA Awards	2009	Individual Achievement in Drama	Bryan Cranston	Won	
TCA Awards	2010	Program of the Year	Breaking Bad	Nominated	
TCA Awards	2010	Outstanding Achievement in Drama	Breaking Bad	Won (Note: Tied with Lost)	
TCA Awards	2010	Individual Achievement in Drama	Bryan Cranston	Nominated	
TCA Awards	2010	Individual Achievement in Drama	Aaron Paul	Nominated	
TCA Awards	2012	Program of the Year	Breaking Bad	Nominated	
TCA Awards	2012	Outstanding Achievement in Drama	Breaking Bad	Won	
TCA Awards	2012	Individual Achievement in Drama	Bryan Cranston	Nominated	
TCA Awards	2013	Program of the Year	Breaking Bad	Won	
TCA Awards	2013	Outstanding Achievement in Drama	Breaking Bad	Nominated	
TCA Awards	2013	Individual Achievement in Drama	Bryan Cranston	Nominated	
TCA Awards	2014	Program of the Year	Breaking Bad	Won	
TCA Awards	2014	Outstanding Achievement in Drama	Breaking Bad	Nominated	
TCA Awards	2014	Individual Achievement in Drama	Bryan Cranston	Nominated	
Visual Effects Society Awards	2012	Outstanding Supporting Visual Effects in a Photoreal Episode	Bruce Branit, Werner Hahnlein, Greg Nicotero, and William Powloski (for "Face Off")	Nominated	
Women's Image Network Awards	2013	Outstanding TV Show Directed By a Woman	Michelle MacLaren	Nominated	
Writers Guild of America Awards	2009	Best Episodic Drama	Vince Gilligan (for "Pilot")	Won	
Writers Guild of America Awards	2009	Best Episodic Drama	Patty Lin (for "Gray Matter")	Nominated	
Writers Guild of America Awards	2009	Best New Series	Breaking Bad (Note: Nominees: Vince Gilligan, Peter Gould, Patty Lin, George Mastras, and J. Roberts)	Nominated	
Writers Guild of America Awards	2010	Best Dramatic Series	Breaking Bad (Note: Nominees: Sam Catlin, Vince Gilligan, Peter Gould, George Mastras, J. Roberts, John Shiban, and Moira Walley-Beckett)	Nominated	
Writers Guild of America Awards	2010	Best Episodic Drama	John Shiban (for "Phoenix")	Nominated	
Writers Guild of America Awards	2011	Best Dramatic Series	Breaking Bad (Note: Nominees: Sam Catlin, Vince Gilligan, Peter Gould, Gennifer Hutchison, George Mastras, Thomas Schnauz, John Shiban, and Moira Walley-Beckett)	Nominated	
Writers Guild of America Awards	2011	Best Episodic Drama	George Mastras (for "I.F.T.")	Nominated	
Writers Guild of America Awards	2011	Best Episodic Drama	Gennifer Hutchison (for "I See You")	Nominated	
Writers Guild of America Awards	2012	Best Dramatic Series	Breaking Bad (Note: Nominees: Sam Catlin, Vince Gilligan, Peter Gould, Gennifer Hutchison, George Mastras, Thomas Schnauz, and Moira Walley-Beckett)	Won	
Writers Guild of America Awards	2012	Best Episodic Drama	Vince Gilligan (for "Box Cutter")	Won	
Writers Guild of America Awards	2012	Best Episodic Drama	Thomas Schnauz and Moira Walley-Beckett (for "End Times")	Nominated	
Writers Guild of America Awards	2013	Best Dramatic Series	Breaking Bad	Won	
Writers Guild of America Awards	2013	Best Episodic Drama	Gennifer Hutchison (for "Buyout")	Nominated	
Writers Guild of America Awards	2013	Best Episodic Drama	George Mastras (for "Dead Freight")	Nominated	
Writers Guild of America Awards	2013	Best Episodic Drama	Sam Catlin (for "Fifty-One")	Nominated	
Writers Guild of America Awards	2013	Best Episodic Drama	Thomas Schnauz (for "Say My Name")	Nominated	
Writers Guild of America Awards	2014	Best Dramatic Series	Breaking Bad	Won	
Writers Guild of America Awards	2014	Best Episodic Drama	Gennifer Hutchison (for "Confessions")	Won	
Writers Guild of America Awards	2014	Best Episodic Drama	Thomas Schnauz (for "Buried")	Nominated	
Writers Guild of America Awards	2014	Best Episodic Drama	Peter Gould (for "Granite State")	Nominated	

== See also ==
- List of awards and nominations received by Better Call Saul
- List of accolades received by El Camino: A Breaking Bad Movie
