= Thirty-Eight Snub =

- Breaking Bad episode
- Episode no.: Season 4 Episode 2
- Directed by: Michelle MacLaren
- Written by: George Mastras
- Cinematography by: Michael Slovis
- Editing by: Kelley Dixon
- Original air date: July 24, 2011
- Running time: 46 minutes

Guest appearances
- Jim Beaver as Lawson; Matt Jones as Badger Mayhew; Emily Rios as Andrea Cantillo; Charles Baker as Skinny Pete; Marius Stan as Bogdan Wolynetz; Ray Campbell as Tyrus Kitt; Ian Posada as Brock Cantillo

Episode chronology
← Previous "Box Cutter"	Next → "Open House"
- Breaking Bad season 4

"Thirty-Eight Snub" is the second episode of the fourth season of the American television drama series Breaking Bad, and the 35th overall episode of the series. It originally aired on AMC in the United States on July 24, 2011. In the episode, Walter plots to kill Gus for fear of repercussions from him, while Jesse holds wild parties to try to forget his despair. Meanwhile, Skyler tries to purchase a car wash business, while Marie struggles to deal with Hank's growing depression problems.

Written by George Mastras and directed by Michelle MacLaren, "Thirty-Eight Snub" featured guest appearances by Emily Rios as Andrea, Jim Beaver as black market gun vendor Lawson, and the first appearance by Ray Campbell in the recurring role of Gus' henchman Tyrus Kitt. Due to filming commitments with the television series Supernatural, Beaver had only a half-day to film his scene, which was set on a constructed set resembling a motel room. "Thirty-Eight Snub" included several unusual camera angles, including a shot from the point of view of a Roomba robotic vacuum cleaner, and an extremely high crane shot of Walter from 180 feet in the air.

Jesse's party scenes, which symbolized the character's internal guilt and fragile state of mind, included background songs by rapper Flavor Flav and the band Honey Claws. "Thirty-Eight Snub" was seen by an estimated 1.97 million household viewers according to Nielsen Media Research, making it the third most-watched episode of Breaking Bad by the fourth season, although it marked a significant decline in viewership compared to the previous episode, season premiere "Box Cutter".

== Plot ==
Walter illegally purchases a .38-caliber snubnosed revolver, which he intends to use to kill Gus, because he believes Gus will kill him if he does not act first. Mike drinks coffee at a bar and discovers Victor's dried blood on his jacket sleeve. Jesse has purchased expensive electronics, including a sophisticated sound system, but remains miserable after having murdered Gale. In an attempt to get over Gale's death, Jesse has Badger and Skinny Pete arrange a multi-day party with dozens of people dancing, drinking, and doing drugs.

While cooking meth at the lab, Walt waits for Gus to arrive so he can kill him. Instead, Victor's replacement Tyrus arrives with Mike, and Mike informs Walt he will never see Gus in person again. That night, Walt drives to Gus' house, but before he can approach, he receives a call from Tyrus, who says simply, "Go home, Walter." The next day, Walt approaches Mike at the bar, and Mike says he observed Walter tailing him there. Mike reveals that in the lab, he could tell Walt was carrying the pistol. Walt suggests Mike and he are in the same danger because Gus could easily kill Mike the same way he killed Victor. Walt asks Mike to put him in a room with Gus so Walt can kill him. Mike punches Walt, knocks him to the floor, kicks him several times, then leaves the bar.

Skyler calls Walt to inquire about buying the car wash where he once worked, which they plan to use as a front business for Walt's drug money. Walt fails to act, so Skyler does her own detailed research about the business's expenses and revenues. She later approaches Bogdan about buying it, but he angrily rejects her and condemns Walt for insulting him when Walt quit working there.

Marie struggles with Hank's deepening depression as he continues his post-shooting physical therapy. The bedridden and bitter Hank constantly ignores or insults Marie and even after he celebrates a successful session with his physical therapist, he refuses to share the excitement with Marie.

After three straight days of partying, Badger and Skinny Pete are exhausted and go home, as do all the other partiers at Jesse's house. Alone with his thoughts, a depressed Jesse breaks down while sitting less than an inch away from his sound system's speakers, which are turned to high volume.

== Production ==
"Thirty-Eight Snub" was written by George Mastras and directed by Michelle MacLaren. Filmed in February 2011, the episode was edited by Kelley Dixon, one of a handful of editors who have regularly worked on the series. The direction in "Thirty-Eight Snub" included several camera angles from unusual viewpoints, including the perspective of Jesse's Roomba, boxes of pizza, a baby's vision and inside a car wash. The filming in Albuquerque, New Mexico was delayed by snow storms and record-low temperatures which resulted in a state of emergency being declared. The episode featured guest performances by Emily Rios as Jesse's ex-girlfriend Andrea and Marius Stan as Bogdan, the car wash owner who constantly mistreated Walter when he worked for Bogdan in the pilot episode of Breaking Bad. Stan is not a professional actor but rather a physicist, and he was teaching at the University of Chicago when "Thirty-Eight Snub" was filmed. "Thirty-Eight Snub" also featured the first appearance by Ray Campbell as Tyrus Kitt, an employee of Gus who has replaced Victor, who was killed in the episode "Box Cutter". The original script referred to the character simply as "New Victor" until Mastras came up with the name Tyrus.

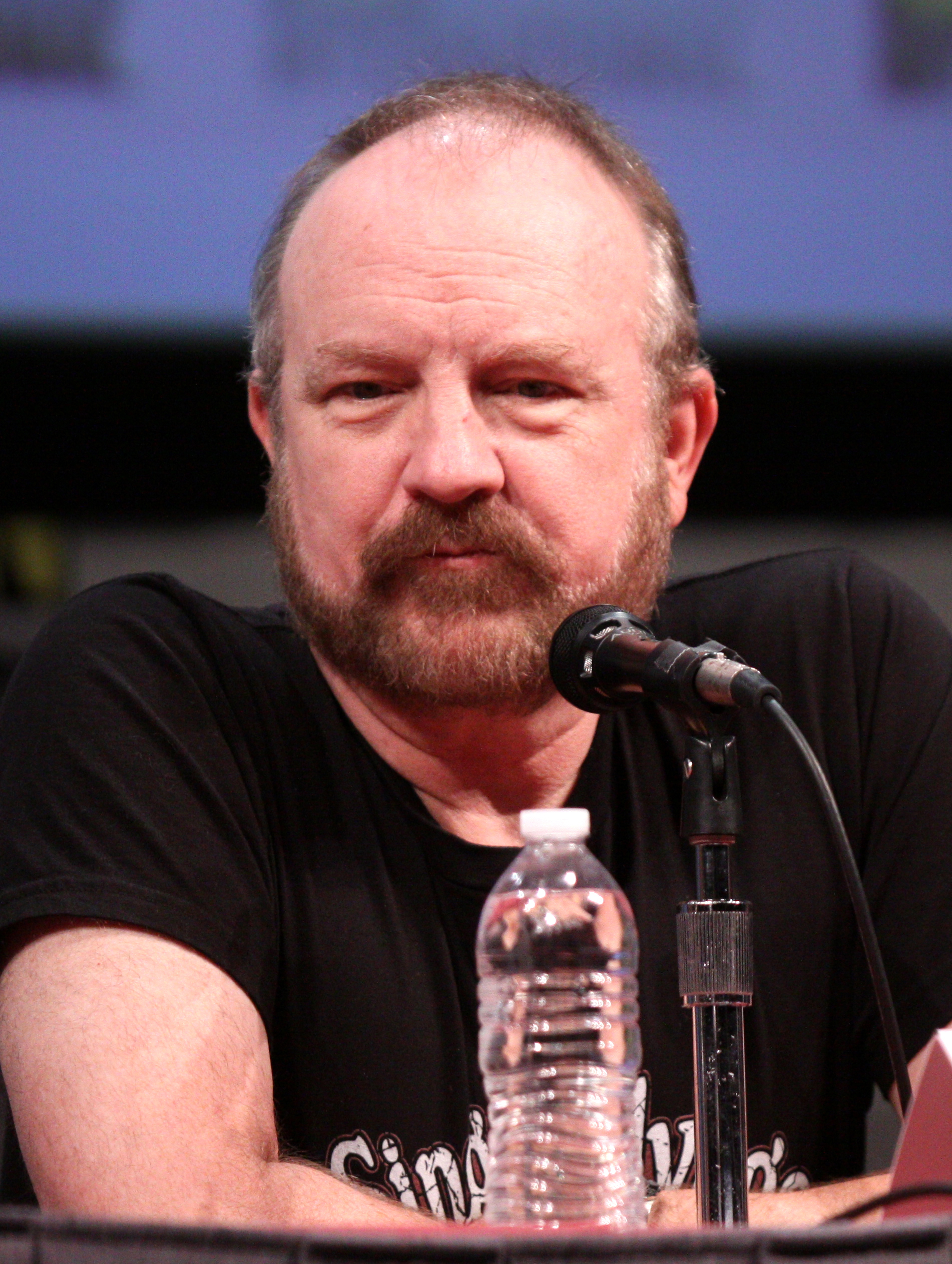
Jim Beaver made a guest appearance in "Thirty-Eight Snub" as black market gun vendor Lawson.

Jim Beaver made an appearance on "Thirty-Eight Snub" as Lawson, the gun vendor from the opening scene. Beaver previously starred in the HBO western drama series Deadwood along with Breaking Bad star Anna Gunn. He also previously appeared in "Field Trip", a sixth season episode of The X-Files which was written by Breaking Bad creator Vince Gilligan. While Gilligan believed Beaver to be a talented actor, he had never met him during the filming of either show. The CW television series Supernatural, in which Beaver co-stars, was filming at the same time as "Thirty-Eight Snub", so Beaver flew into Albuquerque for the Breaking Bad shoot and had only half a day to film the scenes. Mastras said he particularly enjoyed that the character tries to convince Walter to buy a gun legally because, "I like the aspect that you've got this black market dealer who in an ironic way is the sound of morality here."

The motel room that Cranston and Beaver appear in was a set constructed by Breaking Bad production designer Mark Freeborn and construction coordinator William Gilpin. Director Michelle MacLaren wanted a genuine "rundown motel feel", but believed it would be too difficult to film in an actual motel room because it would be too small for the cast and crew to fit inside. Instead, the set was designed so that several of the walls could be removed to make space for the cameras and crew. This allowed greater flexibility in shooting and camera angles, and the walls could be placed back into position if they were needed for the background of a shot. The first shot of the episode includes Walter speaking directly into the camera, and it quickly revealed he is speaking into a mirror in the motel room. MacLaren filmed the shot so it would be deliberately disorienting and unclear to the viewer where Walter was until the camera movement revealed the motel room. New York magazine writer Logan Hill interpreted Walter's speaking into the mirror as a symbol for self-reflection: "He stares at a mirror reflection of himself, studying his own image, wondering if the Walt other people see gives any hint of what he’s carrying inside."

Director Michelle MacLaren rented a 180-foot-tall crane to film a crane shot of Walter in "Thirty-Eight Snub".

The scene when Walter approaches Gus' house with plans to kill him ends with an extremely high crane shot of Walter standing alone in the middle of the street. MacLaren wanted that shot to be extremely effective because she believed it conveyed Walter's helplessness, insignificance and lack of experience. Although the normal crane used for such overhead shots in Breaking Bad was only 30 feet tall, MacLaren rented a 180-foot-tall crane specifically for that shot. Since the crew had only about four hours to shoot before losing the night-time hours, the crane shot was the first one they filmed. It was shot by camera operators Andrew Voegeli, with dolly grip David Jaxx Nagro and gaffer Steven Litecky. Later, for the scene when Walter meets with Mike at a bar, MacLaren backlit Walter as he entered so only his silhouette would be visible when he entered. When the shots of Mike punching Walter was originally filmed, the staging involved Mike standing up, then Walter standing up, then Mike suddenly punching him. Vince Gilligan edited the scene to have Mike simply punch Walter instead to make the action faster and more surprising. The scene was arranged by stunt coordinator Al Goto, and actors Bryan Cranston and Jonathan Banks performed the stunts themselves. Mike kicks Walter several times after he falls, and Goto placed a large sandbag against Cranston's torso for Banks to kick during those scenes.

The party scenes at Jesse's house sought to illustrate Jesse's internal guilt and self-hatred for having murdered Gale Boetticher in the third season finale, "Full Measure". Gilligan said these scenes were written because he wanted to demonstrate that the actions of the characters in Breaking Bad have major consequences. The writing staff spent weeks discussing how Jesse would react to having killed Gale and went with the course of events in "Thirty-Eight Snub" in part because they felt it would be the most unexpected for the audience. Bryan Cranston praised these scenes, saying "I thought it was a great way to show a person going through a private hell. That everybody suffers, deals with their own personal loss in many different ways." The scenes were shot on a set in a sound stage built by production designer Mark Freeborn and construction coordinator William Gilpin. Although scenes in Jesse's house are occasionally filmed in an actual house, these particular scenes could not be shot there because the party was so messy. Breaking Bad music supervisor Thomas Golubic tried to select music appropriate for both the party and Jesse's state of mind, using variations of punk rock, hip hop and dubstep. During one scene when Jesse, Skinny Pete and Badger are snorting meth together, Badger leans down outside of the shot to take the drugs, then Skinny Pete pops back up in a match cut. The shot was conceived by MacLaren during filming.

Mastras had Jesse buy a Roomba because he believed it was appropriate for Jesse's frame of mind: "You don't need it, it's kind of inane. ... He's just trying to fill his world with noise and with these things." During the final shot of the episode, a steadicam shot filmed by Andrew Voegeli, Jesse turns his stereo system all the way up and leans directly against the pulsating speaker to try to shut out his pain. MacLaren wanted the speakers to pulse, but they could not actually play loud music without harming actor Aaron Paul. The special effects crew unsuccessfully tried several methods to make the speakers pulse, such as shaking them and pulling on strings, but they did not appear realistic. It was achieved after MacLaren visited a local stereo store and an employee provided her a bass tester which would run the stereo system with no noise, but cause the speakers to pulse as if music was playing. That employee was hired to come on the set and run the system, and the lights and pulsing were timed to match music which was later dubbed in.

== Cultural references ==
Among the songs played by Jesse on his new sound system are "Money" by D/R Period, "Unga Bunga Bunga" by rapper Flavor Flav, "Raise Hell" by M.O.P and "Digital Animal" by Honey Claws. During a scene at Jesse's house, Badger and Skinny Pete debate which zombie video games are better, Left 4 Dead, Resident Evil 4 and Call of Duty: World at War. The zombies in the latter game, which are also Nazis, are described by Badger as "the Talibans of the zombie world". The unusually large, uncut, pizza purchased for Jesse's party is a reference to the third season episode "Caballo sin Nombre", when Walter flung a pizza of the same type onto the roof of his house after an argument with Skyler.

== Reception ==
=== Ratings ===
In its original American broadcast, "Thirty-Eight Snub" was seen by an estimated 1.97 million household viewers, according to Nielsen Media Research, making it the second most-watched episode of Breaking Bad in series history. Nevertheless, it marked a significant drop in viewership compared to the previous week's episode, fourth season premiere "Box Cutter", which was seen by a series-high of 2.58 million household viewers. "Thirty-Eight Snub" received a 0.9 rating among viewers between ages 18 and 49, means 0.9 percent of viewers in that age bracket watched the episode.

=== Reviews ===
If Sergio Leone had grown up in a meth den, he would've loved this week's episode of Breaking Bad. Those extreme close-ups of Walt's face mimicked the opening shots of The Good, The Bad, and the Ugly. Those tense silences before Walt drew his gun were straight out of Fistful of Dollars. So much of it felt like a Western, right down to the High Noon standoff, with our hero casting a long shadow, and pulling down the brim of his hat as he approached his archenemy.

— Melissa Maerz, Entertainment Weekly

Entertainment Weekly writer Melissa Maerz compared the direction in "Thirty-Eight Snub" to the film-making of Sergio Leone, particularly in its "extreme close-ups", "tense silences" and the "saloon fight" between Walter and Mike. Time magazine writer James Poniewozik said the filming techniques used in Jesse's party – "which starts off like a rap video then turns into some kind of distorted, jumpy tweak-vision" – effectively conveyed Jesse's frame of mind. He also liked the way the script conveyed Marie's "increasing isolation" in dealing with Hank. Alan Sepinwall of HitFix called the episode a "terrific, unsettling hour" and particularly complimented director Michelle MacLaren and cinematographer Michael Slovis, especially for shooting Jesse's party scenes "in a way that let you experience the chaos just as Jesse was trying to". Sepinwall strongly praised Aaron Paul, who he said "keeps finding new layers of Jesse, and new talents to show them with". New York magazine writer Logan Hill praised the film noir elements in the episode's photography, and said the opening scene, with Walter staring into the mirror asking, "So, how's it look?", refers to the season's ongoing theme of internal self-reflection and surveillance. Los Angeles Times writer Emily VanDerWerff said while the episode didn't advance the plot very far, it included a great deal of internal development among the characters, which she called "an interesting new dynamic for the show to explore". She also called Jesse's emotional breakdown at the end "easily the most chilling thing so far this season".

Paste magazine writer Brent Koepp called it "another incredible episode" and said the impending conflict between Walter and Gus "has the makings of one of television's finest showdowns". He also said the script made good use of the supporting characters, and that the growing distance between Hank and Marie was particularly well handled. Matt Seitz of Salon.com compared "Thirty-Eight Snub" to excellent third season episodes that had "very few scenes and sequences but luxuriated in them, allowing the characters (and the viewer) time to experience the tiny eddies and currents of the moment". He also called an overhead shot of Walter standing outside Gus' house alone "one of the best shots in the show's history". Tim Surette of TV.com especially praised the scene with Walter approaching Gus' house, writing: "Breaking Bad has always been good at creating an air of tension, but now it seems as though the series has mastered it. He also said Paul's acting during Jesse's emotional breakdown "ripped my heart out and shredded it to pieces". The Hollywood Reporter writer Tim Goodman said the photography and direction during Jesse's party scenes were masterful: "Here we are four seasons into Breaking Bad and I shouldn't still be amazed at the innovated visuals or perfectly honed sense of sound. These are masters at work, people." Slate writers Jessica Grose and June Thomas both enjoyed the episode, although they found Walter's character increasingly difficult to sympathize with. Both praised the scene when Mike attacked Walter, while Grose especially enjoyed Aaron Paul's performance and Skyler's subplot.

Matt Richenthal of TV Fanatic complimented the opening scene with the gun purchase, which he called "reminiscent of season one, when the show took the slow, fascinating steps that no other program would touch". He also complimented the episodes for taking the viewers "inside the minds" of Walter and Jesse. Craig McQuinn of The Faster Times enjoyed the slow pace of the episode and complimented the show's lack of predictability, claiming he had no idea how Walter's confrontation with Gus would end, "and that’s why I love this show". Michael Arbeiter of Hollywood.com compared the opening scene to the works of Quentin Tarantino, and called the bar Mike frequents "the most beautifully shot setting I've seen in TV lately". He also called the subplot between Marie and Hank a "surprisingly interesting story". Carl Williott of CNN complimented the shows' "clever pieces of misdirection" by having Walter purchase a gun but never getting to use it, and by showing Mike's conflicted emotions but having him side with Gus against Walter. However, Williott said the episode ultimately felt like a "placeholder" for bigger developments in the storyline. Not all reviews were entirely positive. CraveOnline writer Blair Marnell said Walter's near-assassination of Gus was "the highlight of the episode", but felt Jesse's story was "less compelling [and] extremely repetitive", and he found the subplot with Hank and Marie difficult to enjoy because Hank was so unsympathetic.

In 2019, The Ringer ranked "Thirty-Eight Snub" 58th out of the 62 total Breaking Bad episodes.
