= Kafkaesque (Breaking Bad) =

- Breaking Bad episode
- Episode no.: Season 3 Episode 9
- Directed by: Michael Slovis
- Written by: Peter Gould; George Mastras
- Cinematography by: Michael Slovis
- Editing by: Skip Macdonald
- Original air date: May 16, 2010
- Running time: 47 minutes

Guest appearances
- Christopher Cousins as Ted Beneke; Steven Michael Quezada as Steven Gomez; Matt Jones as Badger Mayhew; Charles Baker as Skinny Pete; Jere Burns as Jesse's group leader; Mark Harelik as Doctor; Jeremiah Bitsui as Victor

Episode chronology
← Previous "I See You"	Next → "Fly"
- Breaking Bad season 3

"Kafkaesque" is the ninth episode of the third season of the American television drama series Breaking Bad, and the 29th overall episode of the series. Written by Peter Gould and George Mastras and directed by Michael Slovis, it aired on AMC in the United States and Canada on May 16, 2010.

== Plot ==
Walter White and Jesse Pinkman are now in full production in the new lab and are easily producing 200 pounds of meth each week, as per their quota. Jesse finds that they're even overproducing, and is resentful when Walt refuses to allow him to remove the extra pounds from the shipment, particularly since he has calculated that Gus Fring will net at least $96 million by the end of their three-month contract, while the two of them are receiving only a combined payment of $3 million despite doing all of the work. Walt, however, is unconcerned by this and simply brushes off Jesse's complaints as him being unappreciative.

Hank Schrader is still recovering in the hospital, and Steve Gomez shows up to tell him that the blue meth has made a comeback in several states, thus confirming Hank's suspicions that Heisenberg has not yet been captured. Hank is nevertheless dissatisfied, and reveals that the only reason he's still alive is that he got a warning call a minute before his would-be assassins attacked him. Instantly suspicious of Walt, Skyler White asks him if they, and he, are safe. Walt assures her that they are.

Though Hank is now conscious and functioning, his legs are mostly paralyzed, and the prognosis is that he may not be able to walk again, even with months of physical therapy. His doctor tells Marie Schrader that the therapy he needs is unlikely to fall within their insurance plan; if they paid out of pocket, it could end up costing them tens of thousands of dollars.

Walt meets with Gus at his distribution center to "clear the air." Hank's revelation that he received a phone call before the attack has led Walt to the conclusion that Gus was the one who diverted the Cartel assassins away from him and directed them towards Hank, since an attempted hit on a DEA agent would get the American and Mexican governments to crack down hard on the Cartel and restrict the illegal importing of meth from across the border, thereby granting Gus complete control over the market as the blue meth is produced domestically. Despite having put Hank's life in jeopardy, Walt nevertheless expresses gratitude towards Gus for saving his own life and commends him for his strategy, saying that he'd have done the same in Gus' position. He also brings up the issue of not knowing what will happen when his three-month contract has expired. Gus promises him security for his family and also brings up the possibility of extending their contract to a year, which would increase his earnings to $12 million, although Gus offers a raise to $15 million. Walt considers it, but on the drive back, decides to close his eyes and veer into traffic before diverting out of harm's way at the last second.

Saul Goodman encourages Jesse to purchase a nail salon which he can use to launder the money he makes from the meth business. Jesse flatly refuses, especially since doing so would require him to report his income to the IRS and thereby pay taxes. Tired of having to adhere to the quotas and responsibilities within his new job, and wanting a larger cut of the profits, Jesse decides to steal the leftover pounds of meth that he and Walt produce in the lab to sell separately to the members of his rehab support group. He enlists Badger and Skinny Pete in this endeavor, and during a meeting, they pose as two new members and initiate a conversation within the group where they mention the blue meth, piquing everyone's interest in it.

Marie becomes increasingly frustrated about being unable to find a means to pay for Hank's physical therapy, as their insurance will not cover it. Skyler finally offers to pay their bills directly using Walt's money. She fabricates a story of Walt being a compulsive blackjack gambler, saying that this has been the cause of their recent marital problems. She explains that Walt took to gambling to pay his medical bills after his cancer diagnosis, and after some losses, his winnings have netted them an amount with seven figures. Marie is left shocked and appalled but agrees to take their money to pay for Hank's therapy.

Walt expresses surprise in Skyler's ability to come up with such an elaborate story on the fly. Skyler tells Walt that she "learned from the best" and added that she believes he is somehow responsible for the attack on Hank, and that she is "not forgetting that."

== Production ==
The episode was written by Peter Gould and George Mastras, and directed by Michael Slovis; it aired on AMC in the United States and Canada on May 16, 2010. The title "Kafkaesque" is a word that is brought up in the episode in the context of relating to the nightmarish fictional worlds of Franz Kafka.

== Reception ==
=== Viewership ===
The episode's original broadcast was viewed by 1.61 million people, which was a decrease from the 1.78 million of the previous episode, "I See You".

=== Review ===
Seth Amitin of IGN gave the episode a 9.1/10 rating, stating that the episode "reminded us that the process of Breaking Bad's story is as much fun to watch as the product." Donna Bowman of The A.V. Club gave the episode an A rating noting that a majority of the supporting characters were taking action.

In 2019, The Ringer ranked "Kafkaesque" 48th out of the 62 total Breaking Bad episodes. Vulture ranked it 50th overall.
