= I.F.T. (Breaking Bad) =

- Breaking Bad episode
- Episode no.: Season 3 Episode 3
- Directed by: Michelle MacLaren
- Written by: George Mastras
- Cinematography by: Michael Slovis
- Editing by: Skip Macdonald
- Original air date: April 4, 2010
- Running time: 47 minutes

Guest appearances
- Danny Trejo as Tortuga; Mark Margolis as Hector Salamanca; Christopher Cousins as Ted Beneke; Julie Dretzin as Pamela; Steven Michael Quezada as Steven Gomez; Luis Moncada as Marco Salamanca; Daniel Moncada as Leonel Salamanca; Javier Grajeda as Juan Bolsa; Caleb Jones as Louis Corbett

Episode chronology
← Previous "Caballo sin Nombre"	Next → "Green Light"
- Breaking Bad season 3

"I.F.T." is the third episode of the third season of the American television crime drama series Breaking Bad, and the 23rd overall episode of the series. Written by George Mastras and directed by Michelle MacLaren, it aired on AMC in the United States and Canada on April 4, 2010.

== Plot ==
In a flashback, (Note: During the events of "Negro y Azul".) Tortuga is visited by Juan Bolsa at a bar. Led to the back by Juan, he is attacked by Leonel and Marco Salamanca for being a DEA informant and decapitated with a machete.

Walter White moves back into the house against Skyler White's will. Walter Jr. is thrilled, but Skyler calls the police in an attempt to have Walt thrown out. The police tell her that they cannot do anything without a court order; when one policeman asks Skyler about any possible illegal activity Walt may have been involved in, to serve as legal basis for throwing him out, Skyler declines to mention his drug manufacturing. Later, Skyler meets with her attorney. After she is assured that everything she says is confidential under attorney-client privilege, she admits that Walt is a meth manufacturer; her attorney advises her to sue him for divorce, and tell the police, but Skyler tearfully declines, saying that she does not want Walter Jr. to find out that his father is a criminal, especially given the likelihood that Walt's lung cancer will kill him in the near future. Later on, at work, Skyler begins an affair with Ted Beneke.

Jesse Pinkman is still having trouble coming to terms with Jane Margolis's death but has moved back into his house. Saul Goodman comes by, asking Jesse to try to convince Walt to get back into drug manufacturing; Jesse dismissively says he will handle it. However, later on, he chooses to cook a batch himself.

Leonel and Marco steal a minivan, bringing Hector Salamanca with them to a meeting with Gus Fring and Juan Bolsa. Gus says that they cannot kill Walter now, as he is doing business with him; once Gus's business with him is done, however, he will let them kill Walter.

Hank Schrader is still stressed and provokes a fight at a bar. He uses his status as a DEA agent to prevent the others at the bar from attacking him.

Walt shows the money he has earned to Skyler, in an attempt to get her to accept it, as he says it will help with the mortgage and Walter Jr.'s college tuition. He asks her to at least think about it; however, when she gets home from work later, in an attempt to get Walt to distance himself, she tells him that she had sex with Ted.

== Production ==
The episode was written by George Mastras, and directed by Michelle MacLaren; it aired on AMC in the United States and Canada on April 4, 2010. The episode's title stands for "I fucked Ted," said by Skyler to Walt at the end. It marks the first appearance of Juan Bolsa.

=== Dedication ===
The episode is dedicated to Shari Rhodes, who died from breast cancer during the filming of the third season shortly after this episode was filmed. She is featured in the episode as the elderly lady in an electric wheelchair entering the vehicle the twins need to transport Hector to meet Gus.

== Reception ==
Donna Bowman of The A.V. Club gave the episode an A, writing: "Its genius lies in its penetrating gaze inside each character, some at their most vulnerable, others staring out from behind a carefully-constructed protective shell." Seth Amitin of IGN wrote that although it was weaker compared to other episodes of the series, one of its strengths was that "Elements that don't deserve an entire episode were amalgamated into this one. It was succinct and still very interesting"

In The Bible in Crime Fiction and Drama: Murderous Texts, Caroline Blyth and Alison Jack compare Skyler's cuckolding of Walt to Delilah's emasculation of Samson in the Book of Judges.

In The Methods of Breaking Bad: Essays on Narrative, Character and Ethics, edited by Jacob Blevins and Dafydd Wood, the authors argue that this episode is the most important in Skyler's character arc.

In 2019, The Ringer ranked "I.F.T." 41st out of the 62 Breaking Bad episodes. Vulture ranked it 40th overall.

=== Viewership ===
The episode's original broadcast was viewed by 1.33 million people, which was a decrease from the 1.55 million of the previous episode, "Caballo sin Nombre".
