= David Ury =

American actor

- Born: David Brian Ury; September 30, 1973 (age 53); Sonoma, California, U.S.
- Education: Evergreen State College
- Occupations: Actor, stand-up comedian, Japanese translation specialist
- Relatives: Lesser Ury (ancestor)

David Brian Ury (born September 30, 1973) is an American actor, stand-up comedian, YouTuber, and Japanese translation specialist.

== Early life and education ==
Ury was born and raised in Sonoma, California. He graduated from Sonoma Valley High School, where he acted in theatre productions. He earned a bachelor's degree in linguistics at Evergreen State College in Olympia, Washington and studied abroad in Japan, where he became fluent in Japanese.

Ury is a descendant of German Jewish impressionist painter Lesser Ury.

== Career ==
Since studying abroad in Tokyo, Ury has worked as a translator in film, television, and manga and as of May 2011, he translates and writes English adaptations for manga. Ury moved to Los Angeles in August 2001 where he began performing stand-up comedy.

Cartoonist Keith Knight, a neighbor of his, described Ury's acting career as "Spooge man" and "a cavalcade of reprobates, sleazeballs, derelicts, & weirdos."

== Appearances ==
=== Film and television ===
Ury has made several film and television appearances, including an episode of Tim Kring's Crossing Jordan and in Shoot 'Em Up. He also appeared in Heroes, Malcolm in the Middle, Life, Without a Trace, Breaking Bad, Better Call Saul, Zeke and Luther, and The Librarians. In March 2015, Ury was cast for Rob Zombie's slasher film 31 as Schizo-Head.

A character actor, Ury has died on screen in almost every role he has portrayed.

=== YouTube ===
Ury also has several YouTube channels/accounts/personalities and alter-egos, which include Karaoke Steve and Ken Tanaka, the fictional adopted twin brother of David Ury. Tanaka is described as an Ashkenazi Jewish man adopted as an infant by Japanese parents Hideo and Mari Tanaka, and raised in Shimane Prefecture of Japan; he returns to Los Angeles to find his birth parents Jonathan and Linda Smith.

== Filmography ==
=== Film ===
Year	Title	Role	Notes
2003	Killing the Dream	Interviewer / Agent / Ron	
2004	Witness to Murder	Roger	
2004	Able Edwards	Franklin Wallace	
2004	Bashing	Manager	
2004	Paparazzi	Fan	
2005	The Basement	The cable guy	
2006	Dark Mind	Pony tail man	
2006	Idol	Japanese photographer	
2006	Dark Ride	Attendant #1	
2007	Shoot 'Em Up	Diner holdup leader	
2007	National Treasure: Book of Secrets	Barkeep	
2008	Reversion	Stranger	
2008	Parasomnia	Record store owner	
2009	The Revenant	ATM robber	
2010	The 41-Year-Old Virgin Who Knocked Up; Sarah Marshall and Felt Superbad About It	Yes man	
2012	Pearblossom Hwy	Garr Booth	
2013	Coffee Town	Homeless guy	
2014	Lake Los Angeles	Dan Dan	
2014	Little Boy	Sir Pent	
2016	31	Schizo-Head	
2016	Fear, Inc.	Pete	
2019	Loners	Larry Bressert	
2019	3 from Hell	Travis O'Rourke	
2020	Faith Based	Gerry	
2020	Kajillionaire	Minimart cashier	
2020	Birds of Prey	Sleazy Breeder	
2021	Cockroaches	Edward	
2025	Violent Ends	Lou Byers	

=== Television ===
Year	Title	Role	Notes
2002	Malcolm in the Middle	Mechanic	Episode: "Zoo"
2004	Charmed	Shapeshifter	Episode: "Witchness Protection"
2005	Blue Collar TV	Sketch performer	Episode: "Fashion"
2006	Crossing Jordan	Arthur Hay	Episode: "Blame Game"
2006–2009	Heroes	Super / Landlord	3 episodes
2007	Close to Home	Rooster	Episode: "Internet Bride"
2007	Dash 4 Cash	Moses	Television film
2008	Black Widow	Bixler	Television film
2008	Without a Trace	Gil	Episode: "Better Angels"
2008–2009	Life	Hard Case #1	2 episodes
2009	Breaking Bad	Spooge	Episodes: "Breakage" and "Peekaboo"
2009	Lost and Found	Hotel clerk	Television film
2009–2011	Zeke and Luther	Don / Ron	11 episodes
2010	Rizzoli & Isles	Sandy Grotty	Episode: "Boston Strangler Redux"
2010	Lie to Me	Witness	Episode: "Headlock"
2010	It's Always Sunny in Philadelphia	Spa worker	Episode: "Charlie Kelly: King of the Rats"
2011	The Young and the Restless	Burt	Episode: "Daniel Finally Regains Consciousness"
2011	Bones	Larry Wolfram	Episode: "The Feet on the Beach"
2011	CSI: NY	Tommy 'The Geek' Hurtz	Episode: "Officer Involved"
2011	Dragon Age: Redemption	Tinker	2 episodes
2011	American Horror Story	Robber	Episode: "Piggy Piggy"
2011	Community	Rick	Episode: "Foosball and Nocturnal Vigilantism"
2012	Private Practice	Hank	Episode: "The Standing Eight Count"
2012	Hollywood Heights	Gas station attendant	2 episodes
2012	Raising Hope	Easter Joe	2 episodes
2012	MotherLover	Homeless man	Episode: "Welcome to BroYo"
2013	Justified	Hiram	Episode: "Hole in the Wall"
2013	Touch	Rizzi	Episode: "Two of a Kind"
2013	Maggie	Dennis	2 episodes
2013	The Mentalist	Col. James Harris	Episode: "Wedding in Red"
2013	Masters of Sex		Episode: "Standard Deviation"
2013	CSI: Crime Scene Investigation	Jayson Walt	Episode: "The Lost Reindeer"
2013	Chosen	John Orlando	Episode: "Heroes and Villains"
2014	Mom	Randy	Episode: "Fireballs and Bullet Holes"
2014	The Other Hef	Kenny	Episode: "Welcome to Muirfield"
2014	The Haunted Hathaways	The Green Ghoul	Episode: "Haunted Thundermans: Part 2 "
2014	Grimm	Hofmann	4 episodes
2014	Major Crimes	Joe Epps	Episode: "Down the Drain"
2015	The Librarians	William Shakespeare	Episode: "And the Final Curtain"
2015–2016	Powers	Dr. Death	8 episodes
2016	Those Who Can't	Ron the Exterminator	Episode: "Of Lice and Men"
2016	Rush Hour	Trucker	Episode: "Assault on Precinct 7"
2016	A Cinderella Story: If the Shoe Fits	Freddie Marks	Television film
2017	Escaping Dad	Trucker Pete	Television film
2017	Fresh Off the Boat	Homeless man	Episode: "A League of Her Own"
2017, 2020	Jimmy Kimmel Live!	Sketch performer	2 episodes
2018	The Outpost	Gunter Donnelbrow	Episode: "One Is the Loneliest Number"
2018–2019	Lodge 49	Champ	Recurring role; 19 episodes
2019	The Walking Dead	Zion	2 episodes
2020	Paradise Lost	Raynard Crenshaw	Episode: "Mississippi Ophelia"
2020	Outer Banks	Scooter Grubbs	2 episodes
2020	Tacoma FD	Buffalo Phil	Episodes: "Nightmare Manor"
2020	Woke	Al Durian (aka Trench Coat)	Episode: "Prayers for Kubby"
2022	Better Call Saul	Spooge	Episode: "Hit and Run"

=== Video games ===
Year	Title	Role	Notes
2011	L.A. Noire	Male pedestrian 17	Voice role
