= Más (Breaking Bad) =

- Breaking Bad episode
- Episode no.: Season 3 Episode 5
- Directed by: Johan Renck
- Written by: Moira Walley-Beckett
- Cinematography by: Michael Slovis
- Editing by: Skip Macdonald
- Original air date: April 18, 2010
- Running time: 47 minutes

Guest appearances
- Christopher Cousins as Ted Beneke; Steven Michael Quezada as Steven Gomez; Charles Baker as Skinny Pete; Rodney Rush as Combo Ortega; Julie Dretzin as Pamela; Carole Gutierrez as Mrs. Ortega

Episode chronology
← Previous "Green Light"	Next → "Sunset"
- Breaking Bad season 3

"Más" (Spanish for 'More') is the fifth episode of the third season of the American television drama series Breaking Bad, and the 25th overall episode of the series. Written by Moira Walley-Beckett and directed by Johan Renck, it aired on AMC in the United States and Canada on April 18, 2010.

== Plot ==
In a flashback it is revealed that when Walter White gave Jesse Pinkman his savings to buy an RV, (Note: As seen in "Pilot".) he instead spent nearly all of it partying the night away at a strip club with Combo Ortega and Skinny Pete. The following morning, Jesse panics when he realizes that he only has $1,400 left to buy an RV, but Combo bails him out by selling him his mother's RV for the remainder of the money.

Back in the present, Jesse is furious that Walt received the other half of his payment for the meth and calls him to demand it. Walt denies making any sort of deal for half of the profits, but nevertheless tells Jesse that he does not have his permission to cook his formula. Meanwhile, Hank Schrader is still searching tirelessly for the "rolling meth lab" RV. He learns that his friend and partner, Steve Gomez, is being sent to El Paso in his stead. Hank is left dismayed by this news but nevertheless remains committed to his work. He returns home and has an argument with Marie Schrader after she shows concern for his well-being, feeling that he is being accused by those around him for simply doing his job.

Walt goes to see Gus Fring at Los Pollos Hermanos, admonishing him for giving him Jesse's half of the money in an attempt to lure Walt into Gus' employ. Gus apologizes for the transparency of the ploy, then asks Walt to take a drive with him. In a final attempt to get Walt to accept the offer, Gus drives him to his meth lab which is discreetly housed within an industrial laundry facility. Walt is impressed by the lab and the equipment within but nevertheless declines the offer again, saying that his time in the meth business has cost him his family and he cannot afford to make another bad decision. Gus firmly tells him that a man provides for his family, regardless of whether or not his family appreciates him for it.

Skyler White keeps enjoying her affair with Ted Beneke and is later told by Marie of Hank's change in behavior. Her sister claims that "death changes people", prompting Skyler to reconsider her affair and her opinion about Walt. After finding the large bag of Walt's meth earnings in the house and examining the money therein, Skyler speaks with her divorce attorney and confides in her about the fact that she is currently sleeping with her boss, as well as her doubts on whether Walt did "what he did" for the family. Her attorney encourages Skyler to leave him immediately, for the longer she stays with Walt, the more culpable she becomes towards his crimes. Skyler remains hesitant. However, when she gets home, she is surprised to find that Walt has packed his things, including the bag of money, and left the house. He also signed the divorce contract, having finally accepted Gus' offer to continue his work in the meth business.

Walt meets with Jesse in Saul Goodman's office and hands over Jesse's other half of the payment. However, he coldly tells Jesse that it will be the last money he will ever make in the meth business, as Gus was only using Jesse to get Walt working for him. Jesse is further enraged when Saul goes over to Walt's side, re-negotiating a money-laundering deal to secure himself a cut of Walt's profits. Jesse tells them that this won't stop him from cooking, then leaves the office in a fury. He picks up a broken piece of a curb and tosses it into Walt's newly-replaced front windshield.

Hank's search for the RV leads him to the doorstep of Combo's mother, who never reported her RV stolen after Combo sold it to Jesse. Hank searches Combo's room and finds a picture of Combo and Jesse during their night at the strip club, thereby leading Hank to now set his sights on Jesse.

== Production ==
The episode was written by Moira Walley-Beckett, and directed by Johan Renck; it aired on AMC in the United States and Canada on April 18, 2010.

== Reception ==
Donna Bowman of The A.V. Club gave, "Más" an "A" rating, commending its "clever, touching, and often jaw-dropping turning point for Season 3. Seth Amitin similarly gave it a 9.9/10 score, writing "Everything about "Mas" was great, from start to finish."

Stephen Glass writes in the essay "Better Than Human," that Jesse's act of shattering the windshield on Walt's Pontiac Aztek symbolized the shattering of Walt's pride in the fact that people admire him.

Susan Johnston refers to the episode in her essay "Family Man: Walter White and the Failure of Fatherhood."

In 2019, The Ringer ranked "Más" 57th out of the 62 total Breaking Bad episodes. Vulture ranked it 60th overall.

=== Viewership ===
The episode's original broadcast was viewed by 1.61 million people, which was an increase from the 1.46 million of the previous episode, "Green Light".
