= Breakage (Breaking Bad) =

- Breaking Bad episode
- Walter White and Jesse Pinkman meeting to receive their cut
- Episode no.: Season 2 Episode 5
- Directed by: Johan Renck
- Written by: Moira Walley-Beckett
- Cinematography by: Michael Slovis
- Editing by: Kelley Dixon
- Original air date: April 5, 2009
- Running time: 47 minutes

Guest appearances
- Krysten Ritter as Jane Margolis; Matt Jones as Badger Mayhew; Steven Michael Quezada as Steven Gomez; Michael Shamus Wiles as George Merkert; Dale Dickey as Spooge's woman; David Ury as Spooge; Tom Kiesche as Clovis; Charles Baker as Skinny Pete; Rodney Rush as Combo Ortega; David House as Dr. Delcavoli

Episode chronology
← Previous "Down"	Next → "Peekaboo"
- Breaking Bad season 2

"Breakage" is the fifth episode of the second season of the American television crime drama series Breaking Bad, and the 12th episode overall. It was written by Moira Walley-Beckett and directed by Johan Renck. This episode marks the introduction of Jane Margolis, portrayed by Krysten Ritter. The episode was dedicated to Kim Manners. The episode aired on AMC on April 5, 2009.

== Plot ==
Walter White finishes his first round of chemotherapy and is told he will learn the results in two months' time. However, Walt begins to feel overwhelmed by the growing medical bills, and the money he made from Tuco Salamanca is running out. While he is vomiting into the toilet, he finds something clogging it – the packet of cigarettes Skyler White was smoking.

Jesse Pinkman returns to Clovis to make good on his word: he pays for the towing and repair of his gate. He also works out a deal to store his RV in Clovis' lot and buys a used car from him. Next, he rents an unfurnished apartment from Jane Margolis, who manages the property and lives next door. Although he likes the space, he has no credit history and can only pay in cash. She initially refuses to rent to him but eventually agrees after raising the price for cash only.

Hank Schrader is promoted to a high-ranking Albuquerque liaison for the DEA, and will have to split his time between the city and El Paso, Texas. He goes out to celebrate with his friends but has a panic attack on the elevator ride down. He takes off work to bottle some of the beer he has brewed at home. Marie Schrader is confused at this behavior, but he assures her everything is all right. After she leaves, a bottle breaks during capping, cutting his hand.

Meanwhile, Walt and Jesse meet again to discuss how to distribute their meth. Jesse does not want to work on his own now that the DEA has found him, and suggests building a network of dealers so that they can be both distributors and producers. Walt is initially reluctant, but Jesse threatens to walk if they don't follow his plan. Later, Jesse invites his friends Combo, Skinny Pete, and Badger to his apartment, and discusses employing them as dealers.

At a cookout celebrating Hank's promotion, Skyler demands that Marie apologize for giving Skyler the stolen tiara, or it will irreversibly drive a wedge between them; Marie tearfully does so.

Jesse's dealers are doing well selling their meth until Skinny Pete is robbed by one of his customers. When Jesse gives Walt his share, minus the stolen money, he explains that it is breakage—revenue loss from damaged, lost, or stolen goods—that must be expected as the cost of doing business. Walt, however, worries about what will happen when word gets out that they can be robbed with impunity. He later shows up at Jesse's apartment and gives him a gun, telling him to take care of the problem.

Walt also confronts Skyler over her smoking, but she refuses to apologize for keeping secrets when he has been doing the same. That night, Hank is woken by what he thinks are gunshots and goes through the house with his pistol drawn. It turns out to be caps popping off beer bottles due to pressure. The next day, he drives down to the Rio Grande and throws his trophy of Tuco's grill into the river.

== Production ==
The episode was written by Moira Walley-Beckett and directed by Johan Renck. It aired on AMC in the United States and Canada on April 5, 2009.

== Critical reception ==
Noel Murray, writing for The A.V. Club, gave the episode an A, praising the visual comparisons between different situations in the episode. Seth Amitin of IGN gave the episode an 8.6 out of 10.

In 2019, The Ringer ranked "Breakage" 44th out of the 62 total Breaking Bad episodes. Vulture ranked it 62nd overall.
