= Honey Claws =

American electronic experimental hip-hop band

- Origin: Austin, Texas, US
- Genres: Electronic, experimental, hip hop
- Years active: 2008–2014
- Labels: Self-released
- Past members: Jon Von Letscher; Thomas Sahs; Ben Senior; Traey Hatch

Honey Claws was an American electronic, experimental, hip hop band formed in Austin, Texas in 2008. The band has released three albums and one EP, the first album, Honey Claws, was released in 2008. They released a second album called Money Jaws in 2012. Their most recent album One Law was released in 2014.

== Former members ==
- Thomas Sahs
- Jon Von Letscher
- Ben Senior
- Traey Hatch

== Discography ==
- Healer EP (2008)
- Honey Claws (2008)
- Money Jaws (2012)
- C Sides - Single (2013)
- H Sides - Single (2013)
- One Law (2014)

== Other projects ==
- Jet Horns - by Jon Von Letscher

== In popular culture ==
The band became known when one of their songs, "Digital Animal", from their first record was featured in the episode "Thirty-Eight Snub" of the TV show Breaking Bad.
