= One Minute (Breaking Bad) =

- Breaking Bad episode
- Episode no.: Season 3 Episode 7
- Directed by: Michelle MacLaren
- Written by: Thomas Schnauz
- Cinematography by: Michael Slovis
- Editing by: Skip Macdonald
- Original air date: May 2, 2010
- Running time: 47 minutes

Guest appearances
- Mark Margolis as Hector Salamanca; David Costabile as Gale Boetticher; Michael Shamus Wiles as George Merkert; Nate Mooney as the arms dealer; Luis Moncada as Marco Salamanca; Daniel Moncada as Leonel Salamanca

Episode chronology
← Previous "Sunset"	Next → "I See You"
- Breaking Bad season 3

"One Minute" is the seventh episode of the third season of American television crime drama series Breaking Bad, and the 27th overall episode of the series. It was written by Thomas Schnauz and directed by Michelle MacLaren. The episode follows Hank as he deals with a lawsuit against the DEA by Jesse after Hank physically assaults him. Walt tries to pacify Jesse and have him be his cooking partner. Meanwhile, the Cousins plot Hank's assassination and engage in a shootout with him in a parking lot.

"One Minute" originally aired on AMC in the United States and Canada on May 2, 2010. It was watched by an estimated 1.519 million American viewers and received a 0.6 Nielsen rating among adults between the ages of 18 and 49.

== Plot ==
A flashback in Mexico shows a young Leonel Salamanca complaining to his uncle, Hector, about a toy broken by Leonel's twin brother, Marco, with Leonel proclaiming that he wishes Marco was dead. In response, Hector shoves Marco's head in a tub of icy water despite Leonel's objections, and finally releases him after Leonel punches Hector, while proclaiming, "La familia es todo" (family is all). In the present, Leonel and Marco light candles at a makeshift Santa Muerte shrine. In the center, the twins place a photo of Hank Schrader.

Furious that he was tricked into believing that his wife was in the hospital, Hank goes to Jesse Pinkman's house and attacks him as he opens the door. He knocks Jesse out cold before realizing that he has gone too far. Paramedics come and wheel Jesse away to the hospital as Hank stands by in shock. Walter White and Saul Goodman arrive at the hospital and meet Jesse. Walt notes that they would be in jail if they had not tricked Hank after Jesse blames him for his predicament. Jesse declares that he will make Hank's life miserable by suing him and that he will also resume his drug business, adding that if he gets caught, he would simply make a deal with the authorities to sell out Walt. At the DEA, Hank makes a statement about what happened at the junkyard, but pleads the Fifth when it comes to his actions at Jesse's house. He is then informed that Jesse is filing charges for his actions.

Skyler White visits Walt at his condo. He initially believes she is mocking him, but she pleads with him to pacify Jesse so that Hank does not face charges. Walt refuses despite Skyler's assertion that Hank is his family and asks her to leave.

In the desert, Leonel and Marco meet with a trucker hawking an array of weapons. He gives them a free hollow-point bullet and shows off his bulletproof vest, which Leonel and Marco test by shooting him point-blank. When he survives, they purchase two vests and leave.

Later, at the lab, Gale Boetticher attempts to be friendly with Walt, but he gives him the cold shoulder. He forces a disagreement with Gale and later convinces a reluctant Gus Fring to make Jesse his partner again. At the hospital, Walt pitches the job to Jesse, who mocks it as a ploy to save Hank. He initially refuses, citing Walter's previous wrongdoings against him and his criticism of Jesse's meth. Walt admits that Jesse's meth is good, as good as Walt's own, and leaves. Jesse eventually calls Walt and says he agrees to the partnership.

At the DEA office, Hank admits to assaulting Jesse, resulting in him being suspended without pay and having his gun confiscated. As Hank departs, he learns Jesse is not pressing charges after all. Later, Hank sits in an SUV in a parking lot when he gets a phone call and an electronically-disguised voice tells Hank that he has one minute to leave before two men come to kill him. Hank wonders if it is a prank call, but Leonel and Marco arrive and ambush Hank. He reverses his car into Leonel, pinning him against another car and maiming him from the waist down, then flees with Leonel's gun. Marco empties his gun at a passerby and reloads, dropping the hollow-point bullet in the process, before eventually knocking Hank down with gunshots. Marco decides to kill Hank with his axe and goes to retrieve it from his car. Hank arduously loads the nearby hollow-point bullet into Leonel's gun and kills Marco with a gunshot to the head before he can swing the axe down. Marco's axe lands next to Hank, who falls unconscious from massive blood loss.

== Production ==
The episode was written by Thomas Schnauz and directed by Michelle MacLaren; it aired on AMC in the United States and Canada on May 2, 2010.

Schnauz received writing duties for this episode based on seniority. Originally there was a plan to have the Cousins killed as early as episode 2. Schnauz said the electronically disguised voice warning Hank could either be Mike or another of Gus' henchmen, but is uncertain about who voiced the character. He said it was originally in the script for Mike to appear near the end of the episode, but after it was decided that one of the Cousins would live to make it to the next episode, Mike was scrapped from the episode.

== Reception ==
=== Ratings ===
"One Minute" originally aired on AMC on Sunday, May 2, 2010. The episode was viewed by an estimated 1.519 million American viewers, and received a 0.6 Nielsen rating among adults between the ages of 18 and 49. This means that it was seen by 0.6% of all 18- to 49-year-olds watching television at the time of the broadcast.

=== Critical response ===
Donna Bowman of The A.V. Club praised the suspense and tension of the episode, giving it an "A" and writing that "I doubt you needed the threat of imminent natural disaster for this episode to put you on edge". Seth Amitin of IGN gave the episode a 10/10 ("Masterpiece") rating, saying that "'One Minute' was this show's finest hour, and maybe one of the best episodes of anything we've seen on TV in the last 20 years." In 2019, The Ringer ranked "One Minute" as the 4th best out of the 62 total Breaking Bad episodes. Vulture ranked it 5th overall.

=== Accolades ===
At the 62nd Primetime Emmy Awards, "One Minute" received a nomination for Outstanding Sound Editing for a Series, while Maclaren received a nomination for Outstanding Directing for a Drama Series. The episode was nominated for Outstanding Achievement in Sound Editing – Sound Effects and Foley for Episodic Short Form Broadcast Media at the 2011 Golden Reel Awards.
