= Peekaboo (Breaking Bad) =

- Breaking Bad episode
- Jesse Pinkman leaves Spooge's child at his home as police come
- Episode no.: Season 2 Episode 6
- Directed by: Peter Medak
- Written by: J. Roberts; Vince Gilligan
- Cinematography by: Michael Slovis
- Editing by: Kelley Dixon
- Original air date: April 12, 2009
- Running time: 47 minutes

Guest appearances
- Jessica Hecht as Gretchen Schwartz; Dale Dickey as Spooge's woman; David Ury as Spooge; Carmen Serano as Carmen Molina; Charles Baker as Skinny Pete

Episode chronology
← Previous "Breakage"	Next → "Negro y Azul"
- Breaking Bad season 2

"Peekaboo" is the sixth episode of the second season of the American television drama series Breaking Bad. It was written by J. Roberts and Vince Gilligan and directed by Peter Medak. The episode aired on AMC on April 12, 2009.

== Plot ==
Jesse Pinkman gets the address of the couple who ripped off Skinny Pete and goes to their dilapidated house. Upon breaking inside, he finds and tends to their young neglected son. When the couple returns home, an enraged Jesse holds them up and demands that they return his meth and his money. They give him part of the meth, claiming to have lost the other portion, and show him an ATM they have stolen from a convenience store. The husband, Spooge, works unsuccessfully to open the ATM. While Jesse is busy playing with the son, the wife knocks him unconscious, stealing his gun and drugs. Jesse wakes up to see Spooge trying to open the ATM from the bottom. His wife, angry that he keeps calling her a "skank", knocks the ATM over, crushing him; she then takes his drugs and gets high on the couch. Jesse hurriedly takes back the gun, takes what money he can when the ATM pops open, and calls 9-1-1. He then brings the boy out of the house, tells him not to go back inside, and runs away.

On his first day back teaching after finishing chemotherapy, Walter White teaches his class about Dr. Tracy Hall, the inventor of synthetic diamonds, who earned only a pittance for his invention while General Electric made an incalculable profit. At home, Skyler White gets a call from Gretchen Schwartz, who she still believes is paying Walt's medical bills. Skyler invites Gretchen over that afternoon, but Gretchen quickly leaves when Walt arrives home. Walt follows Gretchen outside and tells her not to say anything until they can talk. Walt later tries to apologize to Gretchen for lying, but Gretchen demands to know why Walt did it and how he has been paying for his treatment. Walt, angry at being cut out of Gray Matter Technologies, denies her any right to that information; Gretchen insists that Walt was the one who left by walking out of their past relationship. Walt curses at Gretchen, making her leave. When Walt gets back home, Skyler tells him that Gretchen called to say that the Schwartzes will no longer be paying for Walt's treatment. Walt claims that the Schwartzes have gone broke, and that he drove up to Santa Fe to discuss the situation with Gretchen.

== Production ==
The episode was written by J. Roberts and Vince Gilligan and directed by Peter Medak. It aired on AMC in the United States and Canada on April 12, 2009.

== Critical reception ==
Donna Bowman of The A.V. Club gave the episode an A−, praising the episode for reversing the roles of Jesse and Walter.

In 2009, TV Guide ranked "Peekaboo" on its list of the 100 greatest television episodes of all time. In 2019, The Ringer ranked "Peekaboo" as the 26th best out of the 62 total Breaking Bad episodes. Vulture ranked it 13th overall.

Aaron Paul was nominated for an Primetime Emmy Award for Outstanding Supporting Actor in a Drama Series for this episode of the show.
