= Sunset (Breaking Bad) =

- Breaking Bad episode
- Episode no.: Season 3 Episode 6
- Directed by: John Shiban
- Written by: John Shiban
- Cinematography by: Michael Slovis
- Editing by: Kelley Dixon
- Original air date: April 25, 2010
- Running time: 47 minutes

Guest appearances
- David Costabile as Gale Boetticher; Matt Jones as Badger; Charles Baker as Skinny Pete; Tom Kiesche as Clovis; Larry Hankin as Old Joe; Luis Moncada as Marco Salamanca; Daniel Moncada as Leonel Salamanca; Tina Parker as Francesca Liddy

Episode chronology
← Previous "Más"	Next → "One Minute"
- Breaking Bad season 3

"Sunset" is the sixth episode of the third season of the American television drama series Breaking Bad, and the 26th overall episode of the series. Written and directed by John Shiban, it aired on AMC in the United States and Canada on April 25, 2010. The episode introduces Gale Boetticher, played by David Costabile.

== Plot ==
Walter White settles into his new surroundings and takes a liking to his new lab assistant Gale Boetticher. Jesse Pinkman shows his meth to Badger and Skinny Pete, and enlists them to enter the drug trade alongside him again, promising that they will not make the same mistakes which got Combo killed. The two reluctantly agree. Meanwhile, Hank Schrader is now conducting surveillance on Jesse due to his connection with Combo, believing that the RV of Combo's mother is in his possession. He receives a call from Marie Schrader, who suggests that he ask Walt about it, due to Walt's previous association with Jesse. Hank takes her advice and calls Walt, asking him if he can recall Jesse owning an RV. Instantly alarmed, Walt realizes that he must now dispose of the RV before Hank can find it.

The Cousins show up at Los Pollos Hermanos and sit in a booth, growing increasingly impatient and angry that Gus Fring is still standing in the way of them carrying out their hit on Walt. Gus eventually confronts them and tells them that they will meet at sunset.

Walt drives to Clovis' lot, where he is fixing the RV while chatting with Badger. Walt informs him that the DEA is trying to find the RV and that they must get rid of it. Clovis tells him about Old Joe, a man who owns a junkyard and will be able to destroy the RV with no questions asked. Badger calls Jesse and tells him that Walt is planning to have the RV destroyed, prompting him to rush to the junkyard. Hank follows him.

Walt drives the RV to the junkyard and pays Old Joe to scrap it. An enraged Jesse suddenly shows up, and Walt, horrified, realizes that he has led Hank right to them. The two lock themselves within the RV while Hank tries to force the door open. Old Joe steps in and tells Hank that an RV is a domicile, and therefore, he cannot legally search it without a warrant. Hank relents and phones the DEA office for a warrant. Thinking quickly, Walt calls Saul Goodman for help, who has his secretary, Francesca, call Hank to tell him that Marie has been in a car accident and is being rushed to the hospital in critical condition. Hank leaves the junkyard and rushes to the hospital, but soon after he arrives, he receives a call from Marie and realizes that it was all a hoax. Seething with anger at having been fooled, Hank suddenly has a face of suspicion. With Hank gone, Old Joe scraps the RV as Walt and Jesse watch solemnly.

Gus meets with the Cousins at sunset in a remote location. He tells them again that he will not allow them to kill Walt until his business with him has concluded, but gives them his blessing to instead go after the man who actually pulled the trigger on Tuco Salamanca: Hank.

== Production ==
The episode was written and directed by John Shiban. It took almost two weeks for the writing team to figure how to have Walt avert Hank when stuck in the RV. Having Hank killed off by Walt was briefly considered as a plot point, according to Gilligan.

== Broadcast ==
The episode aired on AMC in the United States and Canada on April 25, 2010.

== Reception ==
Donna Bowman gave "Sunset" an A. Seth Amitin gave the episode a 9/10, "Amazing", praising the intensity in the climax despite no character being in direct danger.

In Breaking Bad 101: The Complete Critical Companion, Alan Sepinwall writes that the conclusion of Sunset is very "old-school Breaking Bad", because of the way Jesse and Walt manage to make a bad problem worse, only for Walt to think of an ingenious solution to get out of the situation.

In 2019, The Ringer ranked "Sunset" as the 33rd best out of the 62 total Breaking Bad episodes. Vulture ranked it 41st overall.

=== Viewership ===
The episode's original broadcast was viewed by 1.64 million people, which was an increase from the 1.61 million of the previous episode, "Más".
