= Larry Rippenkroeger =

American Stunt Double

- Born: United States
- Occupation(s): Stunt double, actor

Larry Rippenkroeger is a stunt double. He was previously a jet-ski champion.

During the filming of the film Live Free or Die Hard, Rippenkroeger was the stunt double for Bruce Willis. Rippenkroeger was seriously injured when he fell twenty-five feet to the pavement. He suffered broken bones in his face and fractures in both wrists. Production was temporarily shut down. Willis picked up the tab at area hotels for Rippenkroeger's parents and visited him a number of times at the hospital. Rippenkroeger was also visited by actors Josh Duhamel and James Caan, who he also doubled for on Caan's TV series, Las Vegas.
