= Caballo sin Nombre =

- Breaking Bad episode
- Episode no.: Season 3 Episode 2
- Directed by: Adam Bernstein
- Written by: Peter Gould
- Cinematography by: Michael Slovis
- Editing by: Kelley Dixon
- Original air date: March 28, 2010
- Running time: 47 minutes

Guest appearances
- Tess Harper as Diane Pinkman; Michael Bofshever as Adam Pinkman; Christopher Cousins as Ted Beneke; Mark Margolis as Hector Salamanca; Steven Michael Quezada as Steven Gomez; Dan Desmond as Mr. Gardiner; Luis Moncada as Marco Salamanca; Daniel Moncada as Leonel Salamanca

Episode chronology
← Previous "No Más"	Next → "I.F.T."
- Breaking Bad season 3

"Caballo sin Nombre" (Spanish for 'Horse With No Name') is the second episode of the third season of the American television crime drama series Breaking Bad, and the 22nd overall episode of the series. Written by Peter Gould and directed by Adam Bernstein, it aired on AMC in the United States and Canada on March 28, 2010.

== Plot ==
While driving on a highway, Walter White is pulled over by a police officer for his windshield, which was cracked by debris in the Wayfarer crash. (Note: As depicted in "ABQ".) When the officer alludes to having the car taken, Walt angrily snaps at him, leading him to be pepper sprayed and arrested. Hank Schrader picks him up from the station, and Walt tells him about his separation from Skyler White. Walt also tells Saul Goodman, who believes Skyler won't tell the police to avoid consequences against her. He suggests Walt "find another woman" and continue with his trade, but Walt refuses, leading Saul to call Mike Ehrmantraut, who begins staking out the Whites' house.

Jesse Pinkman stops by his old house and discovers that his parents have had it renovated and have put it up for sale. Offended that his father won't let him see the property, Jesse approaches Saul with a plan to buy the house from his parents. Saul offers Jesse's parents $400,000 cash for their $875,000 house on behalf of an anonymous buyer. They are outraged by the offer until Saul threatens to reveal that the house contained a meth lab at one time, which the Pinkmans fraudulently failed to disclose when they put the house for sale. Frightened that this will entangle the house in legal action and make it sell for far less, Jesse's parents agree. After the sale is complete, Jesse confidently walks into the house as its owner in front of his parents.

Walt Jr. experiences severe difficulty understanding why his mother refuses to let Walt back in, eventually snapping at her over dinner. Skyler, meanwhile, goes back to working for Ted. She refuses to sign his altered books, indicating that the fraud is too obvious and thus she cannot sign off on them. Skyler draws a parallel between Ted's and Walt's criminal acts, and asks Ted what his daughters would think of him if they found out of his wrongdoing. Ted believes he would say that he had been weak but that his actions were for the good of his family. She later receives a call from Walt, telling her that Walt Jr. has come to visit him. Walt does not tell his son the truth and takes him home, where he tries to appease Skyler with pizza, to no avail. He later throws the pizza onto the roof in a fit of rage, and Skyler sends him a message, threatening to ask for a restraining order.

Walt proceeds to break into the house in order to forcibly move back in, unaware that Mike is installing surveillance equipment in the house. Elsewhere, the "Cousins" – Leonel and Marco Salamanca – approach their uncle, Hector Salamanca, who is now living in a retirement home following Tuco Salamanca's death. He gives them Walt's name and they eventually find his house. The cousins prepare to kill Walt with an axe, but before they can approach him in the shower, an onlooking Mike has Gus Fring text them, prompting them to leave.

== Production ==
The episode was written by Peter Gould, and directed by Adam Bernstein; it aired on AMC in the United States and Canada on March 28, 2010. The name of the episode is Spanish for "horse without a name", a reference to the song "A Horse with No Name" heard at the beginning and end of the episode.

== Reception ==
Donna Bowman of The A.V. Club gave the episode a B+, especially praising the tense last five minutes of the episode. In 2019, The Ringer ranked "Caballo sin Nombre" 55th out of the 62 total Breaking Bad episodes. Vulture ranked it 48th overall.

=== Viewership ===
The episode's original broadcast was viewed by 1.55 million people, which was a decrease from the 1.95 million of the previous episode, "No Más".

=== Pizza-throwing scene ===
The pizza Walter throws on top of his roof. The moment became an internet meme and led to the frequent vandalization of the real location.

During the episode, Walt throws an entire pizza on the roof of the Whites' house out of rage. Cranston was able to throw the pizza onto the roof in a single take. The production staff reportedly had brought "stacks of pizzas ready to be sacrificed in pursuit of the perfect shot" on set in preparation for multiple takes. The scene became an internet meme. Fans have occasionally shown up to the real home where the exterior of the White house is filmed and thrown pizza onto the roof, eventually causing much distress to the house's owners. The repeated incidents forced Breaking Bad creator Vince Gilligan to make a public plea for fans to stop throwing pizzas on the house's roof. The house's owner Frances Padilla said to NPR in 2015: "We’ve had pizzas on our roof. We’ve had pizzas on our driveway; pizzas until we’re sick of looking at pizzas. I’ll sit outside with a shotgun in a rocking chair. You know, like Granny from Beverly Hillbillies."

As a direct result of these incidents, the crew of Gilligan's subsequent show Pluribus (also set in Albuquerque) constructed fake residences specifically made for Pluribus to avoid creating another residential tourist attraction.
