= No Más (Breaking Bad) =

- Breaking Bad episode
- Episode no.: Season 3 Episode 1
- Directed by: Bryan Cranston
- Written by: Vince Gilligan
- Cinematography by: Michael Slovis
- Editing by: Skip Macdonald
- Original air date: March 21, 2010
- Running time: 47 minutes

Guest appearances
- John de Lancie as Donald Margolis; Jere Burns as Jesse's group leader; Julie Dretzin as Pamela; Carmen Serano as Carmen Molina; Luis Moncada as Marco Salamanca; Daniel Moncada as Leonel Salamanca; Taylor Dearden as Sad Faced Girl

Episode chronology
| ← Previous "ABQ" | Next → "Caballo sin Nombre" |
- Breaking Bad season 3

"No Más" (Spanish for 'No More') is the first episode of the third season of the American television drama series Breaking Bad. Written by Vince Gilligan and directed by Bryan Cranston, it aired on AMC in the United States on March 21, 2010.

This episode introduces assassins Marco and Leonel Salamanca.

== Plot ==
Leonel and Marco Salamanca make a pilgrimage to a Mexican shrine to Santa Muerte, making an offering and leaving a drawing of Heisenberg at the shrine.

After a mid-air plane collision, (Note: As depicted in "ABQ".) all of Albuquerque is in shock. A depressed Walter White is living in his home alone following the departure of his wife, Skyler, who has moved out with their son and newborn daughter to give Walt a chance to pack his things. Walt has pieced together that Donald Margolis inadvertently caused the plane crash when distracted by grief over his daughter Jane's death. Remorsefully he burns several bundles of money on the barbecue, but at the last moment changes his mind and throws the bills into the pool. While helping Walt to transport his belongings to a new apartment, Hank Schrader lifts the bag containing the money Walt obtained in his deal with Gus Fring. Walt openly admits the bag contains $500,000, but Hank laughs it off as a joke. Once in his new apartment, Walt calls to give his family his new address. He later receives a text message reading "Pollos". At a school assembly, Walt becomes agitated as teachers and students open up about the traumas they experienced due to the plane collision. When prompted to share his thoughts, he delivers an awkward speech comparing the accident to the Tenerife airport disaster, disturbing the group by advising them to "look on the bright side".

Skyler speaks to a divorce lawyer about making her separation from Walt permanent but hesitates when the attorney mentions the possibility of uncovering money Walt may have hidden. After being given a ride home from school by his father, Walter Jr. argues with both his parents and expresses anger towards Skyler, who refuses to give him an explanation. She also refuses when asked by her sister Marie Schrader. Finally she confronts Walt, presenting him with divorce papers. When she accuses him of being a drug dealer, Walt admits to being a methamphetamine cook. Skyler storms off in horror, saying that she will not expose his secret if he grants her the divorce and full custody of their children.

Walt's former business partner, Jesse Pinkman, is in rehab trying to overcome his drug addiction and come to terms with Jane's death, expressing self-loathing and guilt. During a group therapy session, the group leader confesses that while high on cocaine on his birthday a decade ago, he ran over and killed his own daughter in his pick-up truck while desperately trying to reach a liquor store for vodka. He follows this up by saying that hating oneself is only an impediment to moving on. Walt picks up Jesse and takes him to his apartment, where Jesse expresses remorse over the events that led to the mid-air collision. Walt tells him he is not responsible for what happened, but Jesse calmly insists that he has learned not to shy away from who he really is: "the bad guy". Inspired by this, Walt visits Gus at Los Pollos Hermanos and tells him of his decision to get out of the meth business. Gus presents an offer for Walt to make $3 million for three months' work, which Walt briefly considers but ultimately refuses.

Meanwhile, the Salamanca twins cross into the US from Mexico hidden in the back of a truck, in search of Heisenberg. After another migrant discovers their affiliation with the Juarez cartel, they kill their fellow passengers and the driver of the truck before blowing it up.

== Production ==
The episode was written by Vince Gilligan, and directed by Bryan Cranston; it aired on AMC in the United States and Canada on March 21, 2010. The title of the episode means "no more" in Spanish, and refers to Walt's decision to quit the meth business.

The episode is the first credited appearance of Cranston’s daughter Taylor Dearden, as a high school student.

== Reception ==
Seth Amitin of IGN gave the episode an 8.8 rating; he also stated that Breaking Bad came back after its eight-month hiatus with, "A wonderful and wonderfully-titled episode. The show is mixing its pitches in the season 3 premiere. After a hard plane-crashing fastball, we're getting an emotionally impacted change-up that lands softly into the catcher's mitt." The A.V. Club gave the episode an A rating. The episode's original broadcast was viewed by 1.95 million people.

In 2019, The Ringer ranked "No Más" 54th out of the 62 total Breaking Bad episodes. Vulture ranked it 45th overall.

At the 62nd Primetime Creative Arts Emmy Awards, Michael Slovis was nominated for Outstanding Cinematography for a Single-Camera Series (One Hour) for his work on this episode, while Skip Macdonald was nominated for Outstanding Single-Camera Picture Editing - Drama Series.
