= I See You (Breaking Bad) =

- Breaking Bad episode
- Episode no.: Season 3 Episode 8
- Directed by: Colin Bucksey
- Written by: Gennifer Hutchison
- Cinematography by: Peter Reniers
- Editing by: Kelley Dixon
- Original air date: May 9, 2010
- Running time: 47 minutes

Guest appearances
- David Costabile as Gale Boetticher; Steven Michael Quezada as Steven Gomez; Michael Shamus Wiles as George Merkert; Javier Grajeda as Juan Bolsa; Charles Baker as Skinny Pete; Jeremiah Bitsui as Victor; Michael Bryan French as Doctor; Daniel Moncada as Leonel Salamanca

Episode chronology
← Previous "One Minute"	Next → "Kafkaesque"
- Breaking Bad season 3

"I See You" is the eighth episode of the third season of the American television drama series Breaking Bad, and the 28th overall episode of the series. Written by Gennifer Hutchison and directed by Colin Bucksey, it aired on AMC in the United States and Canada on May 9, 2010. The episode's title is a play on "ICU", the intensive care unit of a hospital.

== Plot ==
As Jesse Pinkman is leaving the hospital after Hank Schrader's attack on him, he sees Hank being admitted in critical condition with four gunshot wounds. Jesse smiles to himself as Skinny Pete picks him up, satisfied at the karmic justice.

Walter White tells a confused and upset Gale Boetticher that they are not working well together and he is being replaced. Jesse then shows up at that moment, much to Walt's dismay, and displays his uncouth and unprofessional personality as he admires the lab, which confuses Gale even further, realizing that this is his replacement. As he leaves, Victor reminds Walt to not fall behind on their weekly quota.

Jesse informs Walt about Hank's condition, and Walt immediately leaves for the hospital. Walt catches up with his family while Steve Gomez and George Merkert explain to him that two Cartel hitmen (Leonel and Marco Salamanca) made an attempt on Hank's life. Gomez expresses astonishment that Hank was able to take down both of the assassins without his gun, and this prompts Marie Schrader to question why Hank did not have his gun on him. Merkert explains that Hank had to turn it in following his suspension due to the assault on Jesse. Marie lashes out at both of them, blaming them for leaving Hank defenseless and not backing him up when he needed them most. She also briefly blames Walt, believing that Hank would never have crossed paths with Jesse if Walt had never "bought marijuana" from him.

Leonel, his legs now amputated, is being treated in the same hospital as Hank. When Gomez and Walt go to view him from the other side of his door, Leonel recognizes Walt and angrily crawls towards him before eventually being hoisted back to his bed. Walt is startled by this and realizes that he might have been their intended target.

Gus Fring receives a call from Juan Bolsa. The attempted hit on a DEA agent has prompted the Mexican government to crack down on the Cartel and for the border to be monitored with more scrutiny, forcing him to lie low in Mexico. Bolsa is suspicious that Gus was the one who orchestrated the hit, as Marco and Leonel would not have attacked a DEA agent without approval. He tells Gus that he intends to get the truth from Leonel as to who permitted them to act.

Walt spends the day at the hospital while Jesse remains at the lab, waiting for him to return so that they can resume cooking to meet their quota. Walt eventually receives a call from Gus to check in on their progress. Not wanting to give any information that might reveal that his brother-in-law is a DEA agent, Walt lies about why they are falling behind, saying that Gale has set them back significantly, and to make up for it, he promises to produce 400 pounds (180 kg) of meth next week. Gus agrees to this.

Walt is horrified when Gus suddenly shows up at the hospital, bringing free food from Los Pollos Hermanos as a show of his support for the DEA. Gus meets the rest of Walt's family and relates to the time when he first met Hank, (Note: As seen in "ABQ".) revealing to Walt that Gus already knew that his brother-in-law was in the DEA. Walt speaks privately with Gus, assuring him that Hank is not a problem for their business. Gus subtly tells him that Leonel will not be a problem anymore. As he leaves, Leonel suddenly goes into cardiac arrest and dies. Mike Ehrmantraut is then shown disposing of a syringe and leaving unnoticed, the whole appearance of Gus a distraction for him to do his job, and Gomez celebrates.

Later that night, Gus receives another call from Bolsa, whose house is now surrounded by Mexican federales. With Leonel now dead, Bolsa is convinced that Gus is behind all of this, and he vows that the Cartel will seek retaliation against him, but is interrupted by the federales. His bodyguards investigate and are brought down by gunfire. As Bolsa attempts to escape, he is shot to death while Gus listens on the phone.

== Production ==
The episode was written by Gennifer Hutchison, and directed by Colin Bucksey; it aired on AMC in the United States and Canada on May 9, 2010.

== Reception ==
=== Critical reception ===
Donna Bowman of The A.V. Club noted "this episode is all about the organization now employing Walter — its long reach and ruthless ambition" but criticized the hospital scene as "spouting cliches." Seth Amitin of IGN gave the episode a 9.4/10 rating, calling it "a great episode about the emotional debris left in the wake of last week's amazing melee."

In 2019, The Ringer ranked "I See You" 47th out of the 62 total Breaking Bad episodes. Vulture ranked it 61st overall.

=== Viewership ===
The episode's original broadcast was viewed by 1.78 million people, which was an increase from the 1.52 million of the previous episode, "One Minute".
