= Negro y Azul =

- Breaking Bad episode
- The DEA discover the severed head of Tortuga
- Episode no.: Season 2 Episode 7
- Directed by: Felix Alcala
- Written by: John Shiban
- Cinematography by: Michael Slovis
- Editing by: Lynne Willingham
- Original air date: April 19, 2009
- Running time: 47 minutes

Guest appearances
- Danny Trejo as Tortuga; Krysten Ritter as Jane Margolis; Matt Jones as Brandon Mayhew; Christopher Cousins as Ted Beneke; Charles Baker as Skinny Pete; Rodney Rush as Combo Ortega; Todd Terry as SAC Ramey

Episode chronology
← Previous "Peekaboo"	Next → "Better Call Saul"
- Breaking Bad season 2

"Negro y Azul" (Spanish for 'Black and Blue') is the seventh episode of the second season of the American television drama series Breaking Bad. It was written by John Shiban and directed by Felix Alcala. It aired on AMC in the United States on April 19, 2009.

== Plot ==
Walt has trouble getting in touch with Jesse and goes to his apartment. Jesse has been staying inside and smoking marijuana since witnessing Spooge's murder. (Note: As depicted in "Peekaboo".) Walt is at first horrified that someone was murdered but calms down upon learning that Jesse was not the actual killer, and that nobody can identify Jesse. Badger calls to set up a deal. Walt is forced to meet Jesse's dealers and learns they are now afraid of Jesse following a rumor that he killed Spooge. Walt uses Jesse's new underworld reputation to galvanize him into helping expand their operation.

Hank is having trouble fitting in at the DEA office in El Paso, Texas. At a meeting with a cartel informant nicknamed "Tortuga", Hank loses his patience with the man's demands and his apparent disrespect. Later, while waiting for a meeting in the desert, Hank spots a message from the cartels: Tortuga's severed head mounted on top of a tortoise. Sickened by the grotesque display, Hank suffers another panic attack. As the agents laugh, the tortoise blows up.

Due to financial constraints, Skyler goes to her old company to apply for a job. She meets with her old friend and boss, Ted Beneke. He decides to give Skyler her old job in the accounting department. Walt is concerned over Skyler's health at the workplace, especially since she originally left due to health problems from the company's manufacturing. There is obvious sexual tension between Skyler and Beneke; he reveals that he recently separated from his wife, the mother of his two children.

Jesse sees his landlady, Jane Margolis, drawing on their front steps, and connects with her over their love of art. However, he is recognized by a passing motorcyclist who has heard of his reputation and calls him by his real last name. After Jesse later admits to lying to her, Jane says that she doesn't care what he does as long as he doesn't do it at the house. He invites her inside to watch TV, even though he can't get his new television working. She holds his hand as they stare at the blank television.

== Critical reception ==
Seth Amitin, writing for IGN, gave the episode a 9.3/10, commenting: "This was one of the better episodes this season and now we've only just dipped our toes into the deep end."

In 2019, The Ringer ranked "Negro y Azul" as the 36th best out of the 62 total Breaking Bad episodes. Vulture ranked it 58th overall.
