= List of characters in the Breaking Bad franchise =

Cast of neo-Western crime media franchise

Breaking Bad is a crime drama franchise created by American filmmaker Vince Gilligan. It started with the television series Breaking Bad (2008–13), and was followed by the prequel/sequel series Better Call Saul (2015–22) and Slippin' Jimmy (2022), and a sequel film, El Camino: A Breaking Bad Movie (2019). The following is an abridged list of characters appearing across the productions.

== Main characters ==
=== Cast table ===
Character	Portrayed by	Breaking Bad						Better Call Saul						Slippin' Jimmy	El Camino	Total
Character	Portrayed by	1	2	3	4	5a	5b	1	2	3	4	5	6	Slippin' Jimmy	El Camino	Total
Walter White / Heisenberg	Bryan Cranston	Main	Main	Main	Main	Main	Main						SA		SA	65
Skyler White	Anna Gunn	Main	Main	Main	Main	Main	Main									61
Jesse Pinkman	Aaron Paul	Main	Main	Main	Main	Main	Main						SA		M	65
Hank Schrader	Dean Norris	Main	Main	Main	Main	Main	Main					SG				53
Marie Schrader	Betsy Brandt	Main	Main	Main	Main	Main	Main						SA			52
Walter White Jr. / Flynn White	RJ Mitte	Main	Main	Main	Main	Main	Main									54
Gus Fring	Giancarlo Esposito		G	M	M					Main	Main	Main	Main			60
Jimmy McGill / Saul Goodman	Bob Odenkirk		R	Main	Main	Main	Main	Main	Main	Main	Main	Main	Main	Main		99
Mike Ehrmantraut	Jonathan Banks		G	Main	Main	Main		Main	Main	Main	Main	Main	Main		SA	85
Lydia Rodarte-Quayle	Laura Fraser					R	M			Guest	Guest	Guest				13
Todd Alquist	Jesse Plemons					R	M								M	12
Kim Wexler	Rhea Seehorn							Main	Main	Main	Main	Main	Main			60
Howard Hamlin	Patrick Fabian							Main	Main	Main	Main	Main	Main			43
Nacho Varga	Michael Mando							Main	Main	Main	Main	Main	Main			33
Chuck McGill	Michael McKean							Main	Main	Main	R		SA			28
Lalo Salamanca	Tony Dalton										R	M	M			16
Marco Pasternak	Mel Rodríguez Kyle S. More							R		G				M		8
Trent Titweiler	Will Vought													M		4

=== Introduced in Breaking Bad ===
==== Walter White ====
Bryan Cranston

Walter Hartwell White (also known by his alias Heisenberg) (played by Bryan Cranston) is an overqualified high school chemistry teacher from Albuquerque, New Mexico. After being diagnosed with lung cancer, he starts manufacturing methamphetamine to provide for his family upon his death. Knowing nothing about the drug trade, he enlists the aid of his former student, Jesse Pinkman, to sell the meth he produces. Walter's scientific knowledge and dedication to quality leads him to produce crystal meth that is purer and more potent than any competitors'. To avoid the tedious collection of pseudoephedrine required for production, Walter devises an alternative chemical process utilizing methylamine, giving his product a distinctive blue color. His methamphetamine, which is given the street name "Blue Sky", dominates the market, leading to confrontations with established drug makers and dealers.

Walter is initially opposed to the use of violence, but gradually comes to see it as a necessity. He also comes to find his new status as a drug lord psychologically rewarding, leading him to become increasingly willing to resort to criminal acts such as theft, extortion, money laundering, depraved indifference, and murder. Walter's descent, Macbeth-like, into the criminal underworld unearths immense levels of deeply repressed ambition, rage, resentment, vanity, and an increasing ruthlessness which alienates him from his family and colleagues.

==== Skyler White ====
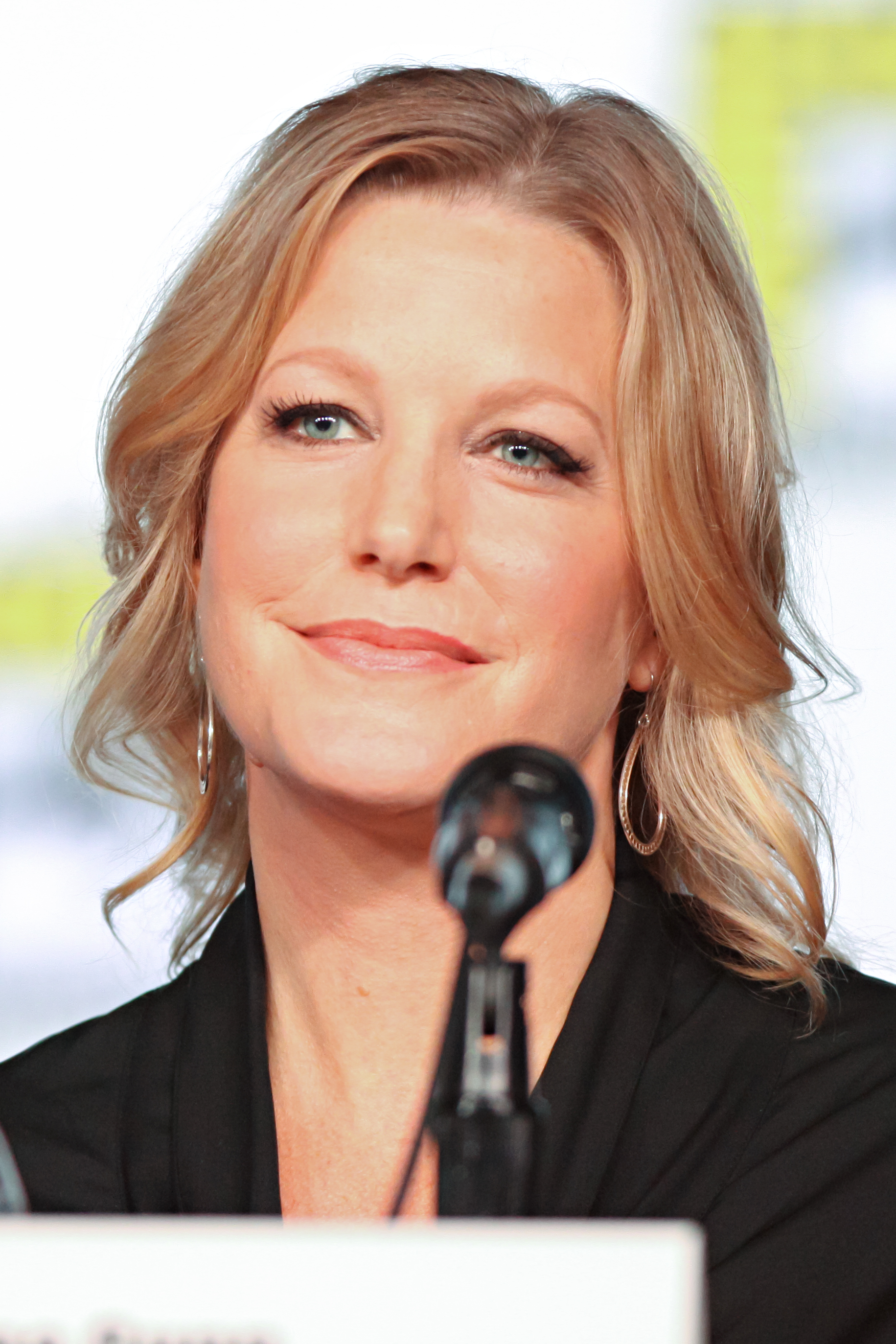
Anna Gunn

Skyler White (née Lambert) (played by Anna Gunn) is Walter's wife. She has had several meager sources of income: writing short stories, selling items on eBay, working as a bookkeeper, and ultimately helping her husband launder money. Skyler and Walter have a son, Walter Jr., and an infant daughter, Holly. Skyler and Walt's marriage becomes increasingly strained due to his unexplained absences and bizarre behavior, ultimately leading to their separation. In season 3, she deduces that Walter is a drug dealer, resolving to divorce him and keep him away from their children. Yet, when Walter implores her to understand his reasons for manufacturing meth, Skyler relents in her opposition to his presence within their home. She also begins getting involved in Walter's criminal life, using his money to pay for her brother-in-law Hank's medical bills following an attack on his life. After meeting Saul Goodman, Skyler concocts a plan to feasibly launder Walter's money through a car wash where he had recently worked part time. The plan is successful, and in seasons 4 and 5, Skyler launders Walter's money through the car wash, though she remains deeply unhappy about their situation. In the final 2 seasons, she becomes increasingly fearful of Walter given that he is slowly becoming more of a hardened criminal. After Walter kills Gus Fring, Skyler's fears are fully realized, and she attempts to distance their children from her and Walter, staging a suicide attempt so that Hank and her sister Marie will temporarily take their children in. She tells Walter that she will be a complicit partner in whatever capacity so long as their children are not living with them. When Walter quits the drug business, he and Skyler begin rebuilding their relationship and their family life until Hank discovers Walt is Heisenberg. When in the episode "Buried", Skyler's DEA brother-in-law Hank tells her he is on to Walt but needs her help to provide sufficient evidence to build a successful case, Skyler replies that she needs a lawyer and later tells Walt they should remain quiet. When Hank is killed, she and Walter fight, and he abducts Holly. Walter uses this as a chance to exonerate Skyler in the eyes of the law, absolving her of any complicity during his drug operations. She is permitted to keep their children; however, she is told that she must find valuable information for the authorities to use against Walter. In the series finale, Walter visits Skyler a final time, admitting to her that his meth business was for him rather than the family; he provides her with the coordinates of Hank and Steve Gomez's whereabouts, imploring her to use them as her escape from his ordeal.

In the episode "Breaking Bad" of Better Call Saul, Skyler is mentioned to have gotten a successful plea deal with the prosecutors.

==== Jesse Pinkman ====
Aaron Paul

Jesse Bruce Pinkman (played by Aaron Paul) is a small-time methamphetamine user, manufacturer, and dealer. In high school, he was an indifferent student in Walter White's chemistry class. Now in his mid-20s, Jesse is Walt's business partner in the meth trade. Jesse is impulsive, hedonistic, and uneducated beyond high school, but he is financially ambitious and streetwise. He talks in playful slang, likes to wear garish clothing that follow the latest trends in youth culture, plays video games, listens to rap and rock music, takes recreational drugs, and drives lowriders. Walt treats Jesse like a foolish son in constant need of stern correction. Jesse's own family kicked him out of their house because of his drug use. Despite the friction between them, he and Walt have a deep bond of loyalty. As a result of his relationship with Walt, Jesse becomes an excellent meth cook, ultimately leading others to exploit him. Despite his criminal lifestyle, Jesse is far more empathetic than Walt. He is horrified by the brutality at the higher levels of the drug trade particularly during later seasons, but remains involved with Walt out of necessity and loyalty. He is very protective of children; his desire to keep children out of the violent drug world gives rise to several key events throughout the series. He wrestles with feelings of guilt about the deaths, all drug-related, of people he has been associated with. Towards the end of the fifth season he is overwhelmed by guilt and his "blood money." Realizing how much pain he has caused for money leads him to attempt to give bundles of cash from his final payoff to people he knows and then throw them from his car window onto random lawns and porches. In El Camino: A Breaking Bad Movie, Jesse departs for a new life in Alaska.

==== Hank Schrader ====
Dean Norris

Henry R. Schrader (played by Dean Norris) is Walt and Skyler's brother-in-law and Marie's husband, who works as a U.S. Drug Enforcement Administration (DEA) agent. He is involved in investigating a meth dealer known as "Heisenberg", unaware for over a year that his prey is actually Walter. Hank has a cavalier exterior, but in reality the dark side of his job affects him more than he cares to admit leading him to suffer from anxiety and post-traumatic stress. In the course of his work, Hank is promoted to El Paso, Texas from Albuquerque for a short time but experiences a traumatic event and moves back to Albuquerque. Despite his brashness, Hank is highly competent at his job and cares deeply about his family. Hank is eventually promoted to Assistant Special Agent in Charge of the DEA in Albuquerque but is still determined to solve the "Heisenberg" case, which ultimately leads to his demise.

Hank also had guest appearances in the fifth season of Better Call Saul. When Domingo "Krazy-8" Molina is arrested, Jimmy McGill bargains with Hank to make Domingo his confidential informant, which allows Lalo Salamanca to feed information on Gus Fring's operations to the DEA.

==== Marie Schrader ====
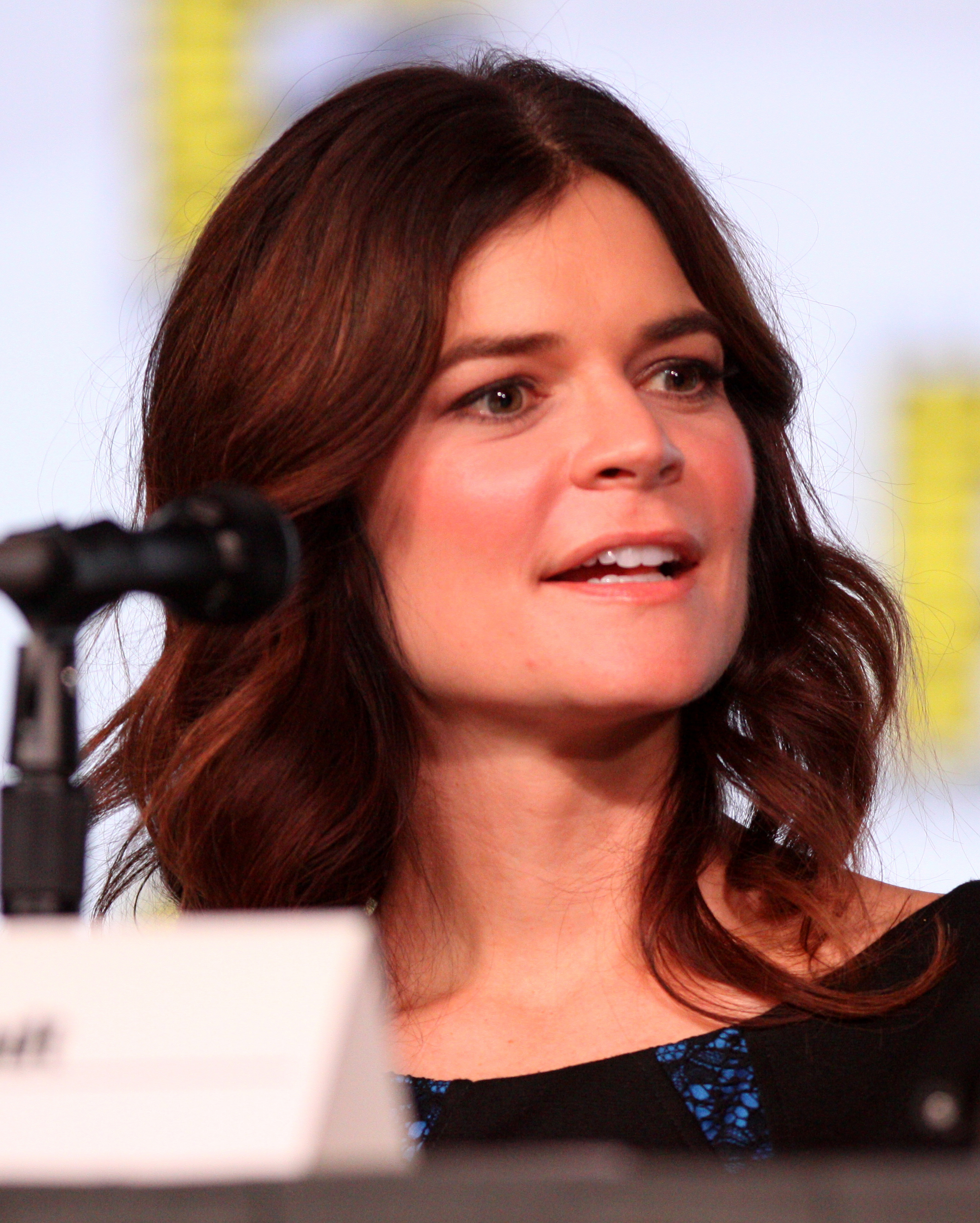
Betsy Brandt

Marie Schrader (née Lambert) (played by Betsy Brandt) is Skyler's sister, Hank's wife, and Walt's sister-in-law. Marie works as a radiologic technologist. She does not hesitate to offer advice to others but often fails to practice what she preaches. She shoplifts compulsively—apparently a manifest symptom of kleptomania—a behavior for which she sees a therapist. She appears self-centered and shallow but cares deeply for her husband and her sister's family. Nearly all of her household and clothing items are shades of the color purple.

In Season 3, Marie becomes a major source of comfort and support for Hank, when The Cousins shoot and nearly kill him. With Walt and Skyler's help, she arranges for Hank to undergo an aggressive physical therapy program their insurance does not cover. When Hank stubbornly decides to stay at the hospital, claiming he is completely disabled, she refuses to give up on him and gives him a handjob to prove he still has feeling below the waist. When he returns home, however, Hank remains cold and brash, despite her attempts to make him comfortable, and Marie spirals back into kleptomania. Once Hank progresses with the case, his relationship with Marie improves again. When Walt and Skyler have marital problems, she takes in their children for a couple of days at Skyler's request while they work things out.

In the final season, Hank tells Marie about Walter's criminal activities, and Marie confronts Skyler. When she learns Skyler knew the truth before Hank's shooting, Marie slaps her sister and storms out of the room. She tries to take Holly with her, but Hank commands her to return the baby. She then urges Hank to capture Walter. Marie helps Hank try to stop Walt and Skyler, but Walt foils them when he makes a DVD framing and blackmailing Hank. Marie eagerly offers to help Hank when Jesse agrees to confess about Walt's crimes. She initially does not know that Hank is dead and reconciles with Skyler on the condition that the latter tells Walt Jr. everything. Marie learns that Hank is missing when Walt kidnaps Holly and eventually she receives confirmation he has died. She is later seen two months later in her house, warning Skyler to watch out for Walt.

Marie reappears in the series finale of Better Call Saul, present as a witness in the trial of Saul Goodman. Prior to the trial, she castigates Saul for his role in Walt's crimes and the deaths of Hank and Steve, but Saul claims to have been coerced to work for Walt under threat of death. Saul later reverses course during the trial by admitting he willingly helped Walt expand his criminal empire.

==== Walter White Jr. ====
RJ Mitte

Walter Hartwell (Flynn) White Jr. (played by RJ Mitte) is Walter and Skyler's teenage son and Holly's older brother. He has cerebral palsy, as manifested in speech difficulties and impaired motor control, for which he uses crutches (which Mitte, who has a milder variation of cerebral palsy, does not require). Angered by his parents' constant fighting, Walter Jr. tries to establish an independent identity, insisting on being called Flynn and asking his best friend Louis to teach him how to drive. When he discovers that Walt has cancer, Walter Jr. changes his attitude and sets up a website, "www.savewalterwhite.com", which requests and collects donations in an effort to help pay for Walt's cancer treatment. Walt's lawyer, Saul Goodman, arranges for a wave of fictional "donations" drawn from Walter's drug money, in order to launder it and also make Walter Jr.'s efforts appear successful. When Skyler and Walt separate, Walter Jr., given no explanation by either parent, only sees that his mother has (from his point of view) inexplicably thrown his terminally ill father out of the house, and he takes his father's side and stops answering to the name Flynn. Always being "late to the game" (as defined by Mitte on an episode of Talking Bad), Walter Jr. remains oblivious to his father's drug trade life until "Ozymandias", when Marie, confident that Walt is in Hank's custody, forces Skyler to reveal the whole truth to her son. Upon learning of his father's connection with Hank's death, Walter Jr. mistakenly concludes that Walt killed Hank. Feeling betrayed, Jr. calls 911 when Walt fends off Skyler's knife attack, thus forcing Walt to leave and eventually end up on the most wanted list. In "Granite State", Walt attempts to talk to him over the phone and have him retrieve $100,000 that Walt planned to send to Louis's address; however, Walter Jr. (by this time, officially registered in school records as Flynn White) angrily refuses and hangs up. In "Felina", Walt visits Skyler for the final time, and watches from afar as Flynn/Walter Jr. returns to the safe house from school.

==== Gus Fring ====
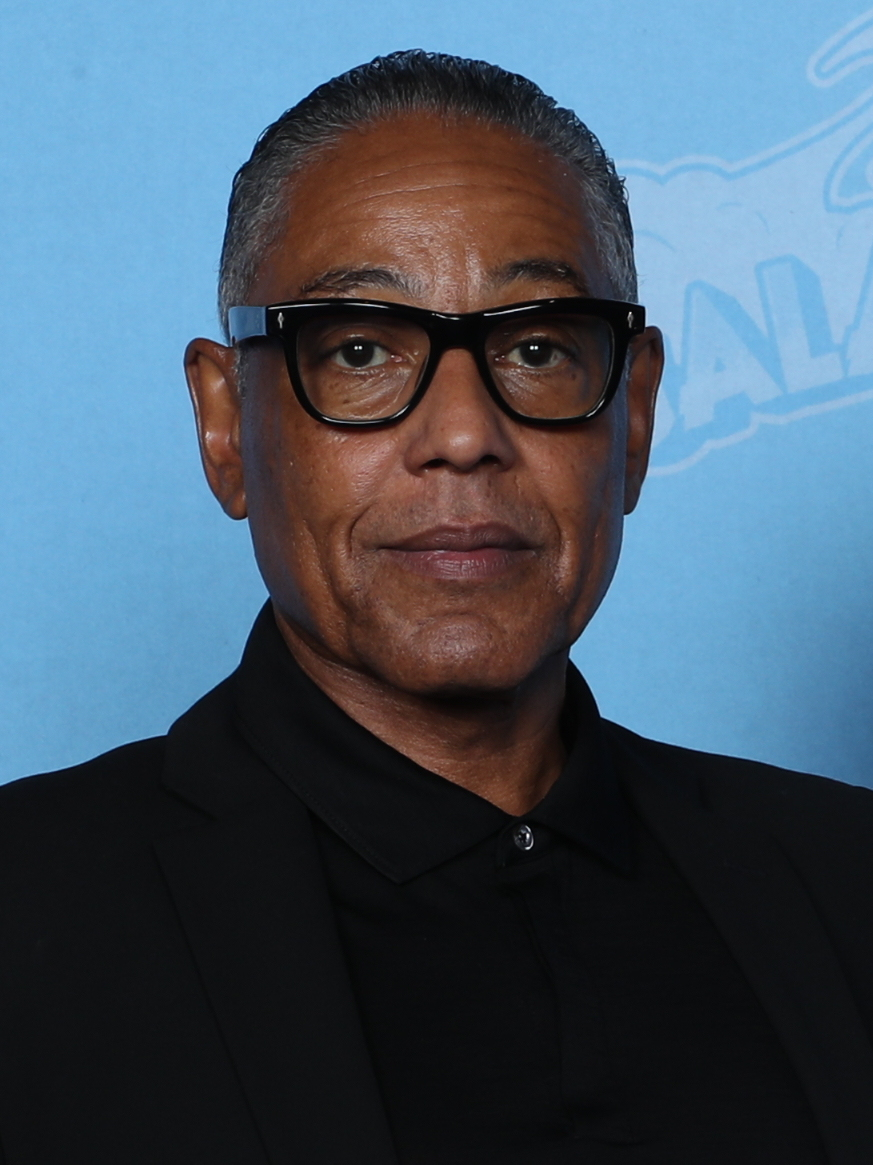
Giancarlo Esposito

Gustavo Fring (played by Giancarlo Esposito) is the Chilean-born proprietor of Los Pollos Hermanos, a highly successful fried chicken restaurant chain. He is also a public booster for the local DEA office and a member of the hospital board. Despite outward appearances, Gus is a major drug kingpin initially affiliated with the Mexican drug cartel in Ciudad Juárez, who use his restaurants as a front for methamphetamine distribution throughout the American southwest, supported by Los Pollos' corporate owners, Madrigal Electromotive. Like Walter White, Gus is a criminal who "hides in plain sight", using his anti-drug philanthropy to conceal his true nature.

As shown in flashback in the Breaking Bad episode "Hermanos", Gus and his business/romantic partner Maximino Arciniega had approached the cartel with the offer to produce and sell meth for the cartel, but Don Eladio had Hector Salamanca kill Max as punishment for going behind Eladio's back, then forced Gus to participate in distributing cartel cocaine. Emigrating to the United States, Gus appeared acquiescent but secretly plotted to exact revenge and eliminate his dependence on the cartel by producing his own meth via a "super lab" hidden beneath an industrial laundry.

During the events of Better Call Saul, Gus allies with Mike when Mike finds his own family at risk from the Salamancas, and turns Nacho into a mole within the Salamanca organization after discovering that Nacho caused Hector to have a stroke by secretly replacing Hector's heart medication with fakes. Wanting to be the agent of Hector's death, Gus pays for Hector's recovery but only to the point where he has recovered his mental faculties and can move his right index finger. Gus seizes more of the drug trade from the Salamancas, but when the cartel sends Lalo to replace Hector, Gus is forced to make sacrifices to protect the developing meth lab and Nacho's status as his mole. Gus arranges an assassination attempt on Lalo, but Lalo secretly survives and begins hunting for evidence of Gus's culpability. Gus realizes Lalo is alive and takes extreme security measures to protect himself. He ultimately kills Lalo in a shootout at the lab's construction site, and has him (and Howard Hamlin) buried beneath the lab's foundation.

By the events of Breaking Bad, Gus produces and distributes meth instead of cocaine, but still seeks independence from the cartel. He has completed the super lab and plans for Gale to be his cook, but when he discovers the superior quality of Walter's blue meth, he hires Walter and reluctantly allows Jesse to serve as Walter's assistant. This leads to a series of confrontations and fallouts that culminate with Jesse killing Gale at Walter's instigation, saving Walter's life by making him irreplaceable to Gus. The relationship between Jesse and Walter falters as a result of Jesse's guilt, enabling Gus to draw Jesse in as an ally. Gus offers Jesse's services to the cartel as part of a ruse to kill Eladio and eliminate the cartel. Knowing his life is still at risk because Jesse has proved to be nearly as capable as Walter in the lab, Walter goads Jesse into providing information Walter uses to set a trap for Gus. During a visit with Hector at his nursing home, Gus plans to finally end Hector's life, but realizes too late that he has been tricked. Hector rings the bell attached to his wheelchair repeatedly to trigger the bomb Walter planted, which kills Hector, Tyrus, and Gus.

==== Saul Goodman ====
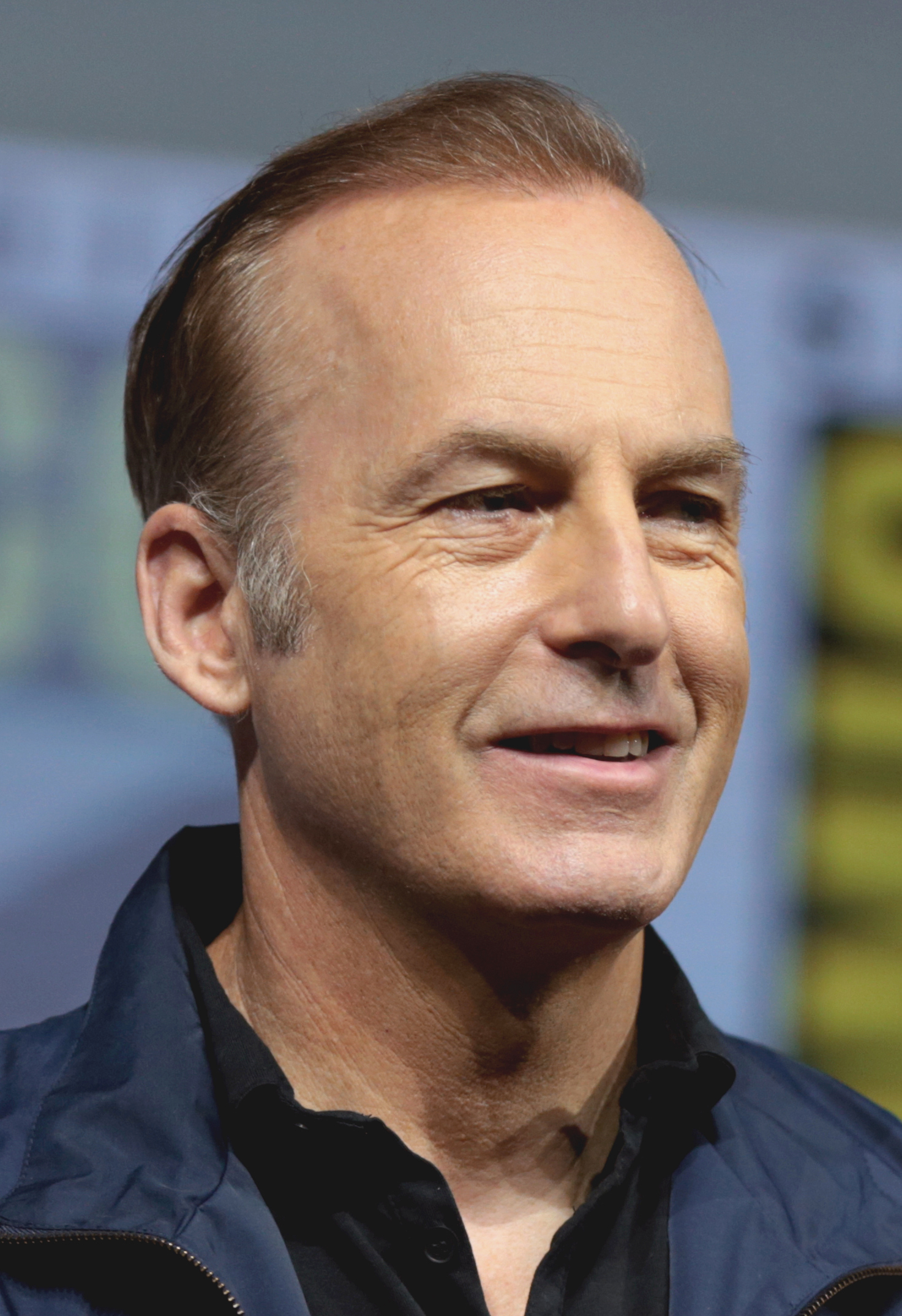
Bob Odenkirk

Saul Goodman (played by Bob Odenkirk), byname of James Morgan (Jimmy) McGill, is a sleazy and unscrupulous lawyer who acts as Walter and Jesse's attorney and provides some of the series' comic relief. He uses the name "Saul Goodman" because he thinks his clients feel more confident with a Jewish lawyer; this name is also homophonous with the expression "[it]'s all good, man." Dressing in flashy suits, Saul maintains extensive connections within the criminal underworld and serves as a go-between connecting drug distributors, fixers, impersonators, and other criminals-for-hire. Despite his flamboyant appearance and mannerisms—punctuated by his outrageously low-budget TV commercials—Saul is a highly competent lawyer who is able to solve problems and find loopholes in order to protect his clients. He is also reluctant to be associated with violence or murder.

Saul's origins are explored in Better Call Saul, the events of which begin about six years before Breaking Bad. Originally a con man nicknamed "Slippin' Jimmy", he is arrested in Chicago after a prank gone wrong, but his older brother Chuck McGill, a partner in an Albuquerque law firm, obtains his release on the condition that Jimmy obtain legitimate employment. Jimmy works in the mailroom of Chuck's firm, and Chuck's legal success inspires Jimmy to become an attorney himself. Chuck does not consider Jimmy a "real" lawyer and surreptitiously conspires to prevent him from joining his firm, relegating Jimmy to low-level cases and public defender work. After Chuck's death and Jimmy's yearlong suspension of his law license, Jimmy returns to practice under the "Saul Goodman" alias, drawing on the criminal clientele he has gained through his side business of selling disposable cell phones. During the period of his law license suspension, Jimmy's side business causes him to inadvertently become involved in the Albuquerque drug business as an associate of Mike and a legal representative for the Salamanca family.

By the time of Breaking Bad, Saul has established an office in a strip mall and advertises across the city. When Walter and Jesse begin producing meth, Saul introduces them to Gus as a potential buyer for their product. He subsequently helps Walter and Skyler launder their drug money, and provides legal assistance for Jesse and his drug-dealing friends. After Hank discovers Walter's identity as Heisenberg, Saul uses the "disappearing" services of Ed Galbraith to relocate to Omaha, Nebraska under the name Gene Takavić (as shown in flash-forwards in Better Call Saul), where he runs a Cinnabon store while remaining paranoid that someone from his past might identify him. Gene is eventually identified by a relocated taxi cab driver who remembers his Saul Goodman ads, but Saul keeps the man quiet by offering to make him wealthy using a con scheme. Saul is eventually caught by the authorities and imprisoned for 86 years in a federal prison, but after finally accepting himself as Jimmy McGill and atoning for his role in the deaths of Chuck, Howard, and others.

==== Mike Ehrmantraut ====
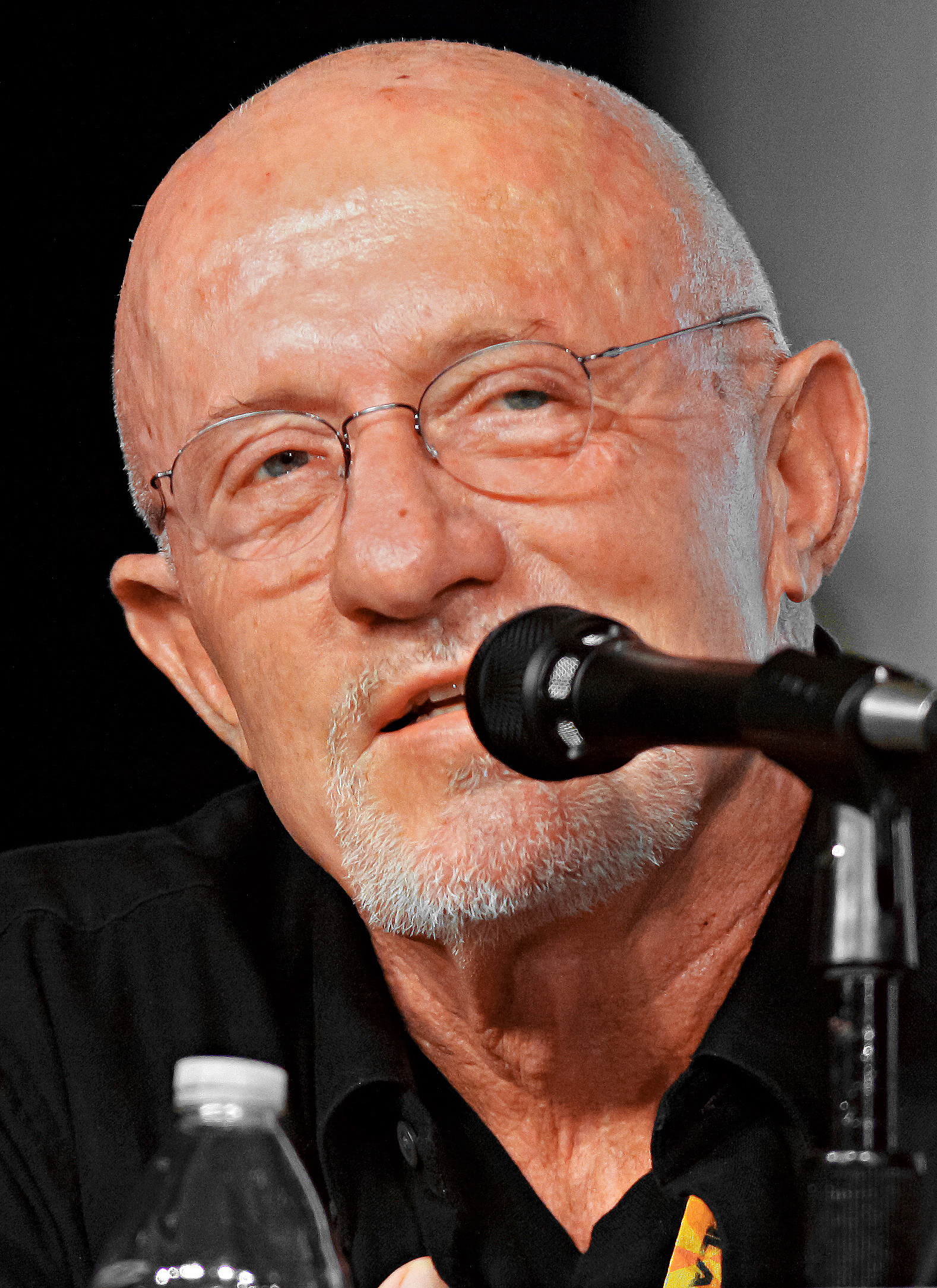
Jonathan Banks

Michael Ehrmantraut (played by Jonathan Banks) is a former Philadelphia police officer who works for Gus — and, on occasion, Saul — as a private investigator, head of security, cleaner, and hit man. In the Better Call Saul episode "Gloves Off", it is implied Mike is a Marine Corps veteran of the Vietnam War. While in Philadelphia, he married and had a son, Matt, who later had his own family: wife Stacey and daughter Kaylee. Mike got caught up in crooked activities within the Philadelphia police, and, after Matt joined the force, Matt hesitated when two crooked cops approached him, so they killed him. After Matt's funeral, Mike murdered the two cops, then fled to Albuquerque to be near Stacey and Kaylee. He took a job as a parking-lot attendant at the local courthouse and also performed for-hire criminal jobs on the side.

In Better Call Saul, Mike becomes Jimmy's associate after Jimmy helps cover for him when Philadelphia officers investigating the deaths of the two cops Mike killed learn of Mike's whereabouts. Through one of his side-jobs, Mike also becomes involved with Nacho. Nacho asks Mike to help eliminate an increasingly unstable Tuco from the Salamanca organization, but Mike instead engineers Tuco's long-term arrest by faking a confrontation in front of police. Hector suspects Mike, so Mike attempts to bring police attention to the Salamanca drug trade. When this effort fails, Mike plans to assassinate Hector but is stopped by Gus, who wants to be the one to decide when Hector dies, and offers Mike a position within his organization. Mike oversees the construction of the "super-lab" led by Werner Ziegler. When Werner escapes and inadvertently reveals some details about the lab to Lalo Salamanca, Gus orders Werner killed to protect the secret, and Mike shoots Werner. Mike is depressed afterwards, until Gus offers him a larger role in helping gain revenge against the Salamancas. Knowing Nacho is operating as Gus's mole in the Salamanca organization, Mike works to keep Lalo off Gus's trail and saves Jimmy from a cartel assassination attempt.

Mike remains as Gus's trusted associate by the time of Breaking Bad, helping to keep Walter and Jesse in line after Jesse kills Gale, and coming up with a plan to drive a rift between Walter and Jesse. Eventually, Gus trusts Jesse enough to bring him and Mike to Mexico as part of Gus's plan to kill Don Eladio and other cartel members. Mike is critically wounded and forced to stay in Mexico to heal. During this time, Walter convinces Jesse to help Walter get revenge on Gus, and Jesse's information enables Walter to lure Gus into a fatal trap. Mike hears of Gus's death and races back to Albuquerque to furiously confront Walter and Jesse. Mike reminds them that, to maintain secrecy, Gus had been discreetly paying off several members of Gus's organization. Walter starts a new meth production system with Jesse and Mike as full partners, and Mike uses part of his share to continue to pay off the members of Gus's old organization. After Todd kills a child during a methylamine heist, Mike and Jesse sell their share of the methylamine, but Mike promises to use part of his profit to continue paying off Gus's old crew. The DEA connects Mike to Heisenberg and, before Mike can flee, Walter tries to obtain the names of Gus's old organization from Mike so Walter can have them killed. Mike refuses and chides Walter, leading Walter to shoot him, but before Mike dies Walter says he realized too late he could have gotten the names from Lydia.

==== Lydia Rodarte-Quayle ====
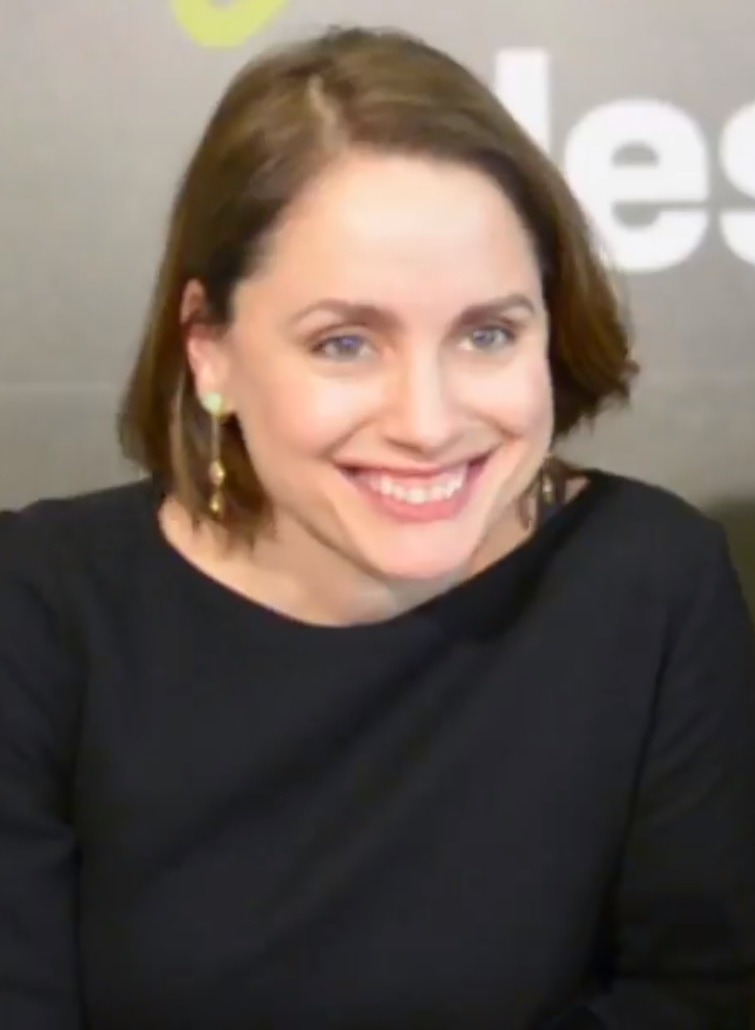
Laura Fraser

Lydia Rodarte-Quayle (played by Laura Fraser) is an executive of Madrigal Electromotive GmbH, working out of the company's office in Houston, Texas. Lydia, portrayed as a very nervous and somewhat troubled character, is a partner in Gus's drug activities, and Gus often works directly through her to secretly secure Madrigal's resources for his needs.

During Better Call Saul, she helps Gus arrange for Mike to become a Madrigal security consultant as a cover to launder the money Mike stole from the Salamancas. When Mike takes his job seriously, Lydia complains to Gus, but Gus assures her Mike can be trusted. When Lalo later arrives and interferes in Gus's operations, Gus reports to Lydia and Peter Schuler, the head of Madrigal's food division, about Lalo stalling the construction of his superlab, but assures them he has a plan to deal with Lalo.

Within Breaking Bad, Lydia continues to discreetly provide chemicals to Gus for Walt's meth production in Gus's superlab. After Gus's death and the destruction of the lab, Walt establishes a new meth production line with Jesse and Mike, with Lydia providing the chemicals. The DEA links Gus to Madrigal, and nervous that she will be exposed, Lydia asks Mike to kill 11 co-conspirators who were part of Gus's organization. Mike refuses, so Lydia pays one of the co-conspirators to eliminate Mike along with the other 10 on the list, but Mike kills the hitman first, discovers Lydia's role, and blackmails her to continue to provide the methylamine for Walt's operation. The DEA continue to investigate Madrigal, and Lydia discovers they are tracking her methylamine shipments to Walt. She provides Walt with information on a railroad tanker car shipment of methylamine, which would provide Walt with enough material to make millions of dollars' worth of meth for sale to Lydia's contacts in the Czech Republic.

Walt, Mike, and Jesse enlist Todd to help steal the methylamine. During the theft, they are observed by a young boy, whom Todd kills. Mike and Jesse then decide to sell their portion of the methylamine to Walt and leave the business, with Mike using a portion of his profits to continue paying the members of Gus's organization for their silence. When the DEA connects Mike to Gus, Walt tries to get Mike to provide the names of the individuals he is paying, but Mike refuses. Walt shoots Mike, then realizes he could have asked Lydia for the names. Mike dies, and Lydia later provides the names to Walt. Walt then pays Jack to eliminate the individuals Mike was paying.

Walt eventually sells the remaining methylamine to Declan and leaves the drug business. Todd initially works as Declan's meth cook, but when Declan fires Todd, the replacement is not as good, and Lydia's Czech customers are dissatisfied. Declan refuses to rehire Todd, so Lydia arranges to have Jack kill Declan and his gang and take over the business. After Hank discovers Walt is Heisenberg and uses Jesse to lure Walt to the site of his buried money, Jack's gang arrives, kills Hank and Gomez, takes most of Walt's money, and kidnaps Jesse so they can force him to be their meth cook. Walt is forced into hiding, but a year later returns to Albuquerque to get his revenge before he dies from cancer. He meets Lydia and Todd at a coffee shop and offers them a new method for methylamine-free meth production. Todd declines, but Lydia feigns interest so that Walt will meet with Jack, then tells Todd to make sure Jack kills Walt at the meeting. Walt uses the meeting to kill Jack and his gang with a machine gun hidden in his car, and Jesse kills Todd. An ill Lydia calls Todd's cell phone to ask if Walt is dead. Walt answers and reveals that she will soon be dead because he slipped ricin into her stevia at the coffee shop. In El Camino: A Breaking Bad Movie, Jesse hears a radio news report indicating that a woman from Houston, presumably Lydia, is critically ill after having been poisoned. The report indicates that her suspected ties to Walt are being investigated, and that she is not expected to survive.

==== Todd Alquist ====
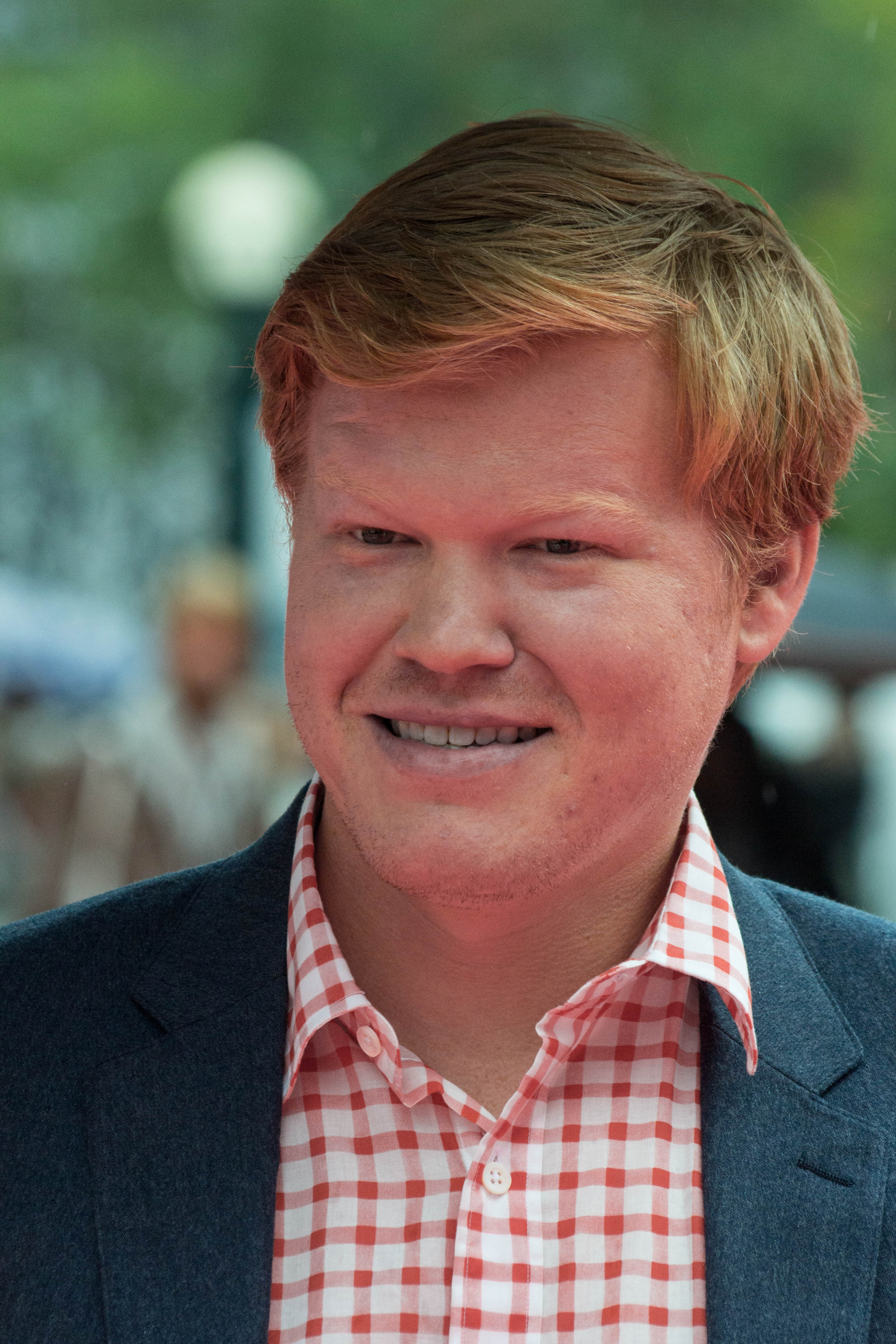
Jesse Plemons

Todd Alquist (played by Jesse Plemons) is an exterminator for Vamonos Pest, a fumigation company used by Walt, Mike, and Jesse as the front for their meth business after Gus Fring's death. Todd and the other Vamonos employees are also burglars, gathering information from the houses they tent and selling it to outside parties. Todd notices and disables a nanny cam at Walt and Jesse's first post-Gus Fring cook site, attracting their attention as someone they think might be useful in the future. He aids in the heist of methylamine from a freight train, and gives a friendly wave to a boy who stumbles on the crime scene, but then shoots him without warning. The team reluctantly keeps Todd employed after the murder, accepting his explanation that he assumed there could be no witnesses to the crime and they all risked arrest. Todd's explanation, plus his claims that his uncle (Jack Welker) runs a gang with connections that could be valuable to the meth operation, convince Walt and Mike to keep him alive, although Jesse is reluctant.

After Jesse and Mike quit, Todd becomes Walt's assistant in the cooking process. Todd respectfully refers to Walter as "Mr. White", and after studying under Walt, he spends his breaks going over his notes, but refuses to accept payment until he satisfies Walt's standards. After Walt kills Mike, Todd helps dispose of Mike's car and body, and Walt uses Jack's prison connections to eliminate Gus's nine living former employees and their lawyer to keep them from exposing Walt.

After the gang captures Jesse, Todd convinces his uncle to force Jesse to cook for them instead of killing him. Jesse creates a batch with a level of purity comparable to Walt's. Thinking he deserves a reward for a job well done, Todd brings him ice cream and praises him for his skill. Todd's bad side is again on display when he shoots and kills Jesse's ex-girlfriend Andrea to punish Jesse for an escape attempt, but apologizes before he shoots her. Months later, Walter kills Jack's gang by remotely firing an M60 machine gun installed in the trunk of a car. Todd survives, but Jesse strangles him with the chains of his handcuffs, choking him hard enough to snap his neck.

Todd's unpredictable switches between charming politeness and respectful gestures to sudden acts of extreme violence led his character to be called the most dangerous villain on Breaking Bad, and IGN named him 2013's best TV villain.

In El Camino: A Breaking Bad Movie, Todd appears in flashbacks that take place after Jesse's failed escape attempt and Andrea's death. Todd, Kenny, and Neil Kandy torment Jesse as Neil builds his new restraints. Todd later enlists Jesse's help to add a canopy to his El Camino and bury the body of Todd's cleaning lady, whom he murdered after she accidentally found his hidden money. After Jesse's escape from the compound, he returns to Todd's apartment and retrieves the cash to use in his escape from Albuquerque, but is forced to contend with two criminals, Neil Kandy and Casey, who want the money for themselves.

=== Introduced in Better Call Saul ===
==== Kim Wexler ====
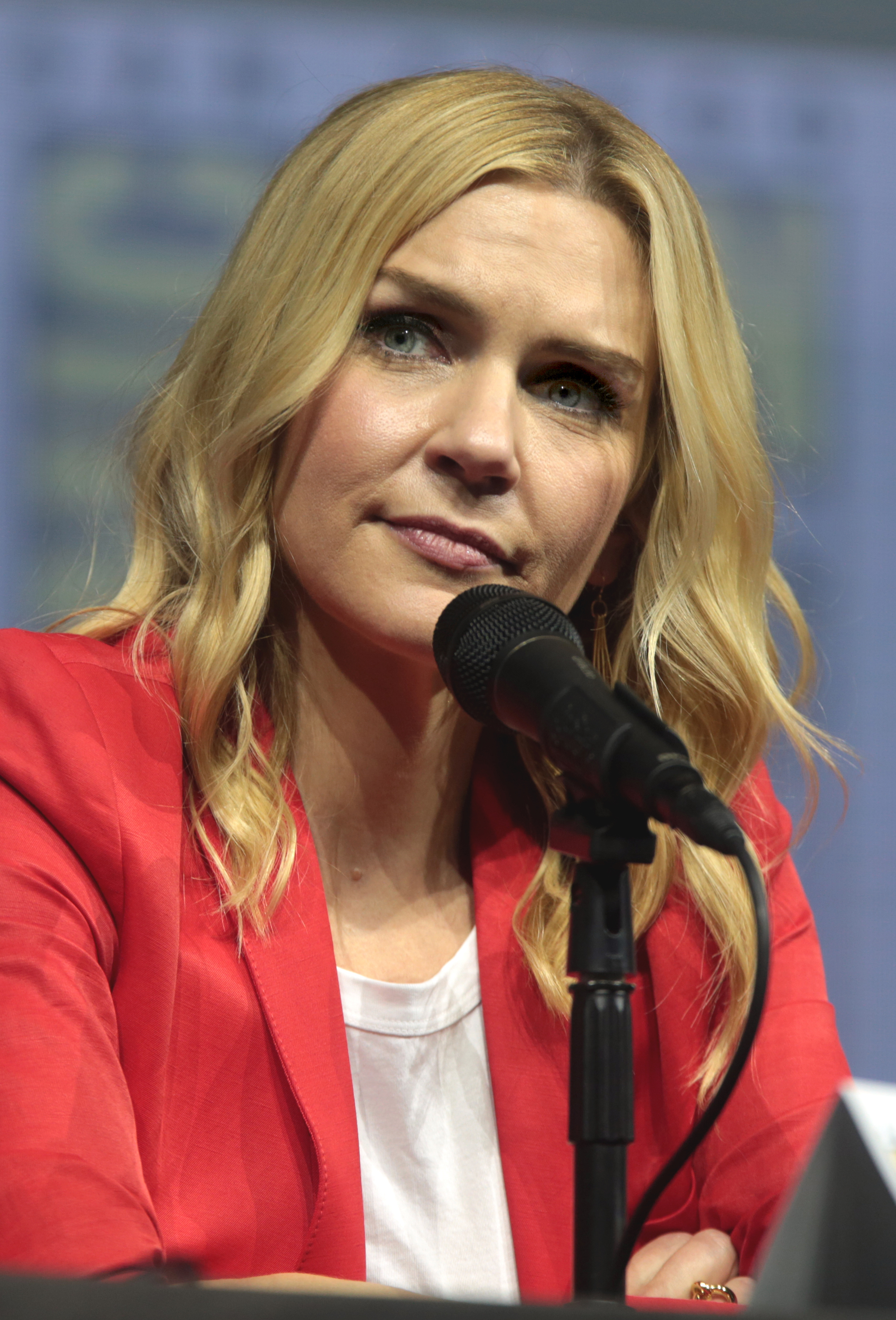
Rhea Seehorn

Kimberly Wexler (portrayed by Rhea Seehorn) is Jimmy's friend, romantic partner and by the fifth season, his wife. In her youth, she and her mother moved frequently around Nebraska, and she often had to take care of herself due to her mother's drunkenness, leading her to become self-reliant. While attending law school, Kim was an intern at Hamlin, Hamlin & McGill, where she met Jimmy, who was working in the mail room. Her success at completing law school and becoming an associate at HHM partially inspired Jimmy to become a lawyer.

Jimmy's intuition about activity at a local nursing home, Sandpiper Crossing, results in a prolonged lawsuit. Kim attempts to defend Jimmy's unethical legal manipulations to Howard and Chuck, which threatens her career. Even when she is able to secure the large regional bank Mesa Verde as a client for HHM, Howard downplays her contributions. Kim and Jimmy start co-located law offices and Kim brings Mesa Verde with her. Chuck succeeds at persuading Mesa Verde to return to HHM. Jimmy forges paperwork in a Mesa Verde filing, which makes Chuck appear incompetent and causes Mesa Verde to return to Kim. Kim is pleased to have the account but Jimmy's machinations lead to a confrontation with Chuck that results in Jimmy's law license being suspended, Chuck being compelled to retire from HHM, and Chuck committing suicide.

Kim becomes bored with banking law and begins taking on pro bono criminal defense cases. She subsequently proposes to Rich Schweikart, the managing partner of the firm defending the Sandpiper chain, that she bring Mesa Verde with her and become a partner in charge of a new banking division. Finding herself drawn in by Jimmy's schemes, Kim later decides to quit Schweikart & Cokely and representing Mesa Verde while continuing to handle pro bono criminal defense cases. Howard suggests that Kim is throwing her career away at Jimmy's instigation; Kim is insulted and scoffs at Howard's belief that she cannot think for herself.

After Jimmy regains his law license and begins practicing as Saul Goodman, he becomes increasingly involved with the Salamanca drug cartel. Kim proposes that they marry so they can invoke spousal privilege, enabling Jimmy to speak freely about his clients. Lalo Salamanca is arrested under an assumed name and accused of murder. When Jimmy goes missing after driving to a remote desert location to pick up bail money, Kim unsuccessfully attempts to learn his location by revealing to Lalo that she is Jimmy's wife. While Jimmy is stuck in the desert with Mike Ehrmantraut, he admits that Kim knows about his involvement with the Salamancas, which causes Mike to warn Jimmy that Kim's life is as much at risk as theirs.

After posting Lalo's bail, Jimmy conceals Mike's involvement by lying to Lalo. Lalo locates Jimmy's abandoned car near the site of the pickup and finds it riddled with bullets, a detail that contradicts Jimmy's story. Lalo confronts Jimmy and Kim, but Kim berates Lalo for not trusting Jimmy. Lalo appears satisfied with Kim's explanation and departs. Kim and Jimmy check into a hotel so that Lalo will not find them if he returns. Still angry at Howard, Kim suggests to Jimmy that they resolve the Sandpiper lawsuit by intentionally sabotaging him, which will result in Jimmy receiving more than $1 million as his share of the settlement or judgment. Jimmy is unnerved by the callousness of Kim's plan but agrees to participate.

The scheme against Howard succeeds after he embarrasses himself at a Sandpiper settlement conference, forcing HHM and Davis & Main to accept a lower amount than they sought. Howard pieces together the con and confronts Kim and Jimmy at their apartment that night, but Lalo arrives and kills Howard. Lalo has Kim drive to Gus's house to shoot him, but she is apprehended by Mike, to whom she explains the situation. When she tells Gus that Jimmy convinced Lalo to send her instead of him, Gus deduces that the assassination attempt was a ruse. Kim is reunited with Jimmy at their apartment the following morning; Mike has Howard's death staged as a suicide and instructs them never to speak of the events of that night. Kim is overwhelmed with guilt, surrenders her law license, and leaves Jimmy soon after Howard's memorial service.

Kim relocates to Florida, takes a job at Palm Coast Sprinklers, and lives a simple, mundane life. One day, she receives a call from Jimmy; she tells him to turn himself in, but he reacts angrily and mockingly tells her to do the same. Kim takes his words to heart and flies to Albuquerque, where she submits an affidavit to the district attorney's office detailing Jimmy's and her role in character-assassinating Howard. She also gives a copy to Howard's widow Cheryl, giving Cheryl grounds to file a wrongful death civil suit. Kim returns to Albuquerque after Jimmy's arrest, but Jimmy admits during his trial that he implicated her in his crimes only so she would be present to hear his confession. He admits the extent of his role in Walter White's criminal empire, his part in wrecking Howard's reputation, and his sabotaging of Chuck's career. He receives a sentence of 86 years; Kim visits him in prison to bid him farewell.

==== Howard Hamlin ====
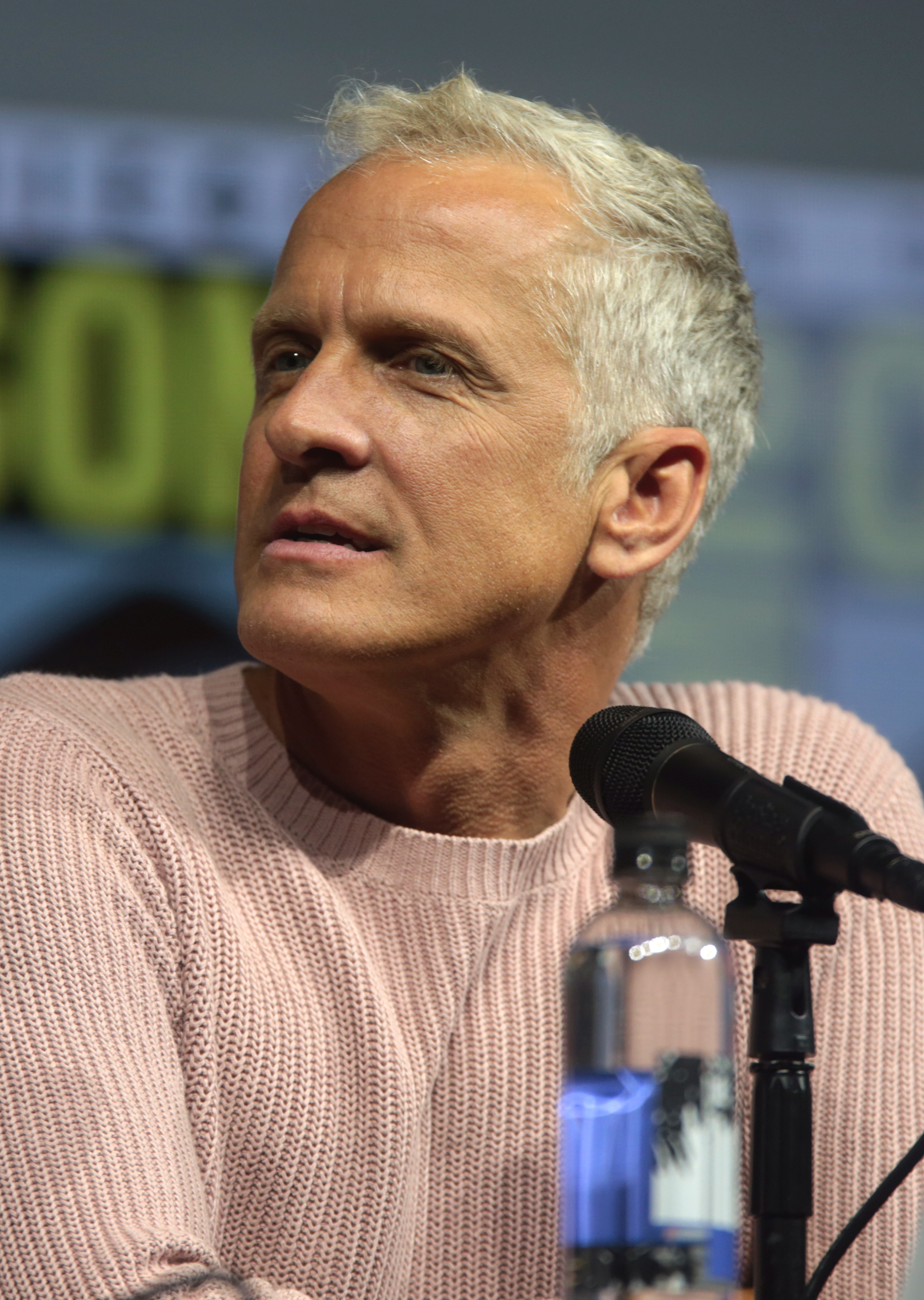
Patrick Fabian

Howard G. Hamlin (portrayed by Patrick Fabian) is a name partner of the successful Albuquerque law firm Hamlin, Hamlin & McGill. At first glance Howard appears to be one of life's winners. His privileged background, unflappability, sun-kissed good looks that appear unchanged over time, and ample charm prove to be a constant source of frustration for Jimmy, as is his positive relationship with HHM's other name partner, Chuck McGill.

After Chuck steps away from the firm due to his claim of electromagnetic hypersensitivity, Howard becomes the managing partner and enables Chuck to work from home while Jimmy takes care of Chuck's personal needs. Unbeknownst to Jimmy, Chuck uses Howard to block Jimmy from advancing in the legal profession. Jimmy believes Howard is the one inhibiting his career progression, causing him to become resentful of Howard. When Kim Wexler quits HHM, Mesa Verde Bank agrees to hire her as outside counsel, but Chuck and Howard succeed at bringing Mesa Verde back to HHM. Jimmy then alters paperwork in one of Chuck's Mesa Verde filings, causing him to appear incompetent, so Mesa Verde returns to Kim. Chuck secretly records Jimmy's admission to tampering with the Mesa Verde documents, then makes Jimmy aware of the recording. When Jimmy breaks in to Chuck's home to destroy it, Howard is present and serves as Chuck's corroborating witness, enabling him to have Jimmy charged with breaking and entering. Instead of a criminal prosecution, Chuck presents the confession to the state bar association in hopes of having Jimmy disbarred, but Jimmy and Kim minimize Chuck's argument by exposing his alleged electromagnetic hypersensitivity as psychosomatic. Jimmy's law license is suspended but he is not disbarred. Howard counsels Chuck to consider Jimmy's suspension a win, but Chuck remains unsatisfied.

After Jimmy's suspension, he "accidentally" informs HHM's malpractice insurer of Chuck's condition, causing the insurer to demand that Chuck be constantly supervised by another attorney or that HHM pay a substantial premium increase. Chuck wants to fight the insurance company, but Howard pays Chuck the first of three installments to buy out his share of the firm and forces Chuck into retirement. Chuck subsequently kills himself and Jimmy initially believes himself responsible. When Howard admits that he believes himself responsible because he forced Chuck to retire, Jimmy allows Howard to shoulder the blame. For much of the next year, Howard is emotionally withdrawn and the notoriety around Chuck's death causes HHM to lose clients and go into dire financial straits. By the time Jimmy regains his law license, Howard announces that HHM has recovered and is once again one of Albuquerque's top firms.

Howard later offers Jimmy a position at HHM and says the feud was between Chuck and Jimmy, not Jimmy and the firm. Jimmy is upset by the reminder of his past and toys with Howard while claiming to consider his offer. Howard eventually realizes that Jimmy is conducting a harassment campaign against him and rescinds the offer, while Jimmy says that as Saul Goodman, he is too big for the constraints of an HHM job. When Kim tells Howard she quit Schweikart and Cokely and gave up the Mesa Verde account so that she could focus on pro bono criminal defense cases, Howard says she is throwing her career away at Jimmy's instigation. Kim scoffs at the idea that she cannot think for herself and says Howard does not really know Jimmy. Howard angrily tells her that Chuck – who recognized that Jimmy could not stop himself from hurting everyone close to him – was the one who knew Jimmy better than anyone else. Kim later proposes to Jimmy that they obtain Jimmy's share of the multi-million dollar settlement or judgment from the Sandpiper Crossing lawsuit sooner by ruining Howard's reputation.

As Kim and Jimmy plan and execute their con, Howard becomes aware of their machinations and tells his wife Cheryl, with whom he has a strained relationship, that he is attempting to solve the problem. Jimmy and Kim's plan succeeds, Howard is humiliated in front of his clients and peers, and HHM and Davis & Main accept a settlement from Sandpiper that is lower than what they wanted. Howard pieces together the whole plot and arrives at Kim's apartment to confront her and Jimmy. Lalo Salamanca arrives soon afterwards, intending to interrogate Jimmy and Kim about their ties to Mike Ehrmantraut and Gus Fring. Howard disregards Jimmy and Kim's entreaties to leave immediately, and Lalo kills Howard with a gunshot to the head. Howard's death is staged to look like a suicide, while he is buried alongside Lalo underneath the floor of Gus Fring's underground meth lab.

==== Nacho Varga ====
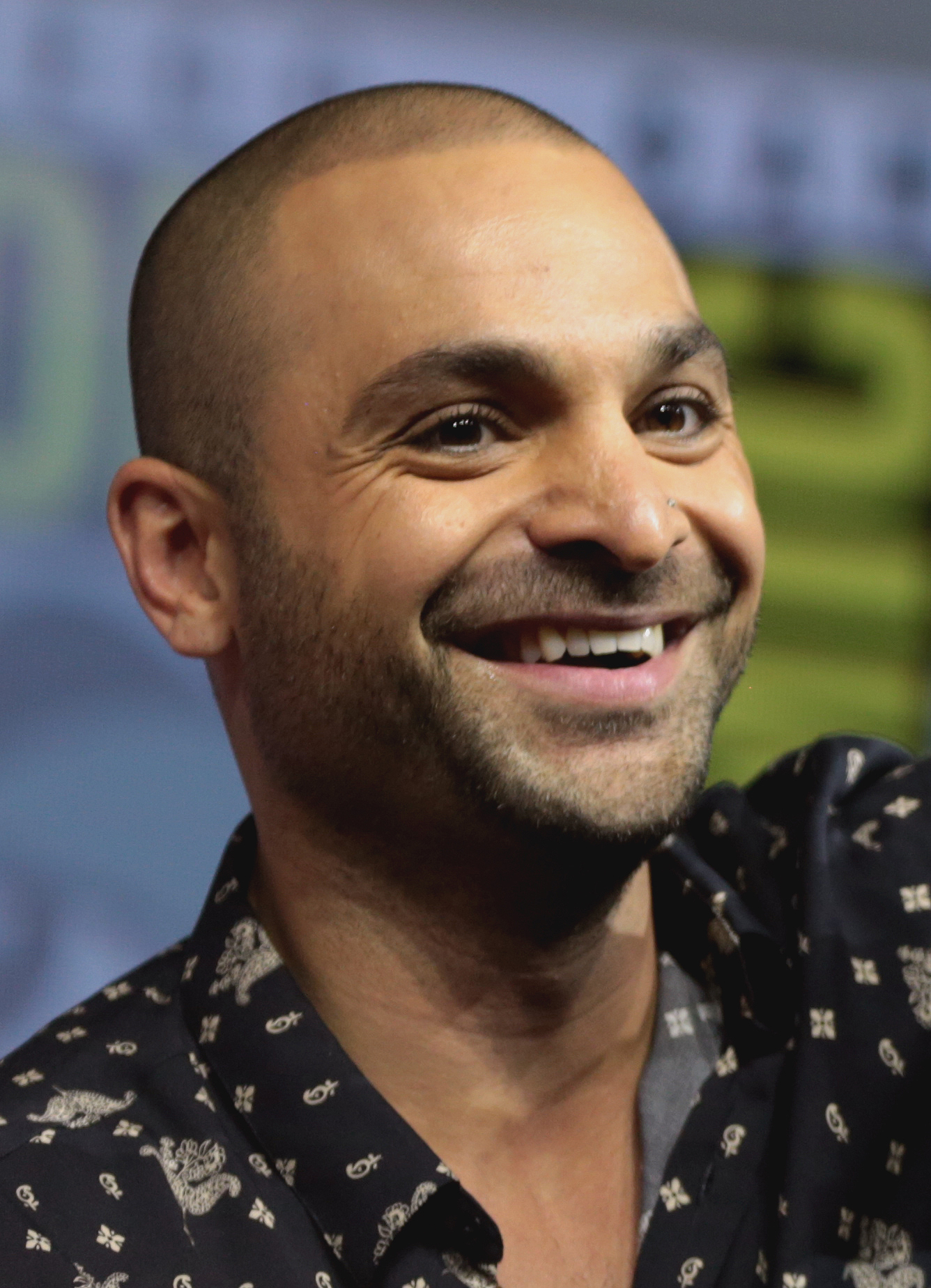
Michael Mando

Ignacio Varga (portrayed by Michael Mando) is a calculating, intelligent career criminal. He is the right-hand man to Tuco Salamanca, heir to Hector Salamanca's organization. While not yet a kingpin himself, Nacho is bright and has the ear of his terrifying boss. Nacho meets Jimmy during the Kettleman embezzlement case and unsuccessfully attempts to persuade Jimmy to help him steal the cash from the Kettlemans. Nacho also comes to respect Mike after seeing his professionalism during one of Mike's criminal side-jobs. As Tuco becomes increasingly unstable, Nacho asks Mike to kill Tuco. Mike opts instead to manipulate Tuco into assaulting him in view of the police, which results in Tuco being sent to prison for several years. Nacho is promoted to become Hector's right-hand man, but becomes concerned when Hector wants to use his father Manuel's upholstery store as part of the Salamanca drug ring. Nacho is forced to reveal that he works for Hector, which causes a rift between Manuel and Nacho. Nacho attempts to kill Hector by inducing a heart attack through replacing Hector's angina medication with a placebo. During a heated meeting, Hector has a stroke, which results in his permanent reliance on a wheelchair. Gus discovers Nacho's involvement and threatens to reveal it to the Salamancas unless Nacho acts as his mole within the Salamanca organization.

Following Hector's stroke, the Salamancas bring Lalo to Albuquerque to manage their operations. As instructed by Gus, Nacho becomes Lalo's confidante and reports back to Gus and Mike. Nacho also introduces Lalo to Jimmy when one of their dealers, Krazy-8, is caught with drugs. Jimmy secures Krazy-8's release by having him give the DEA the locations of Gus's drug money dead drops and making him a confidential informant. Nacho informs Gus about Lalo's plan but Gus allows the DEA to seize the drops in order to protect Nacho's identity as his mole. Using information provided by Nacho, Gus has Mike arrange for Lalo's arrest under an assumed name, but even in prison, Lalo poses a danger to Gus's organization. The cartel provides Lalo's bail money, and Lalo has Nacho drive him to Mexico. Lalo then introduces Nacho to Don Eladio and explains a plan to place Nacho in charge of the Salamanca operation in Albuquerque while Lalo remains in Mexico to hide from police and prosecutors. Gus intends to have Lalo killed, and Nacho receives a call instructing him to open the back gate to Lalo's villa at 3 am. Nacho opens the gate and flees. Armed men enter and attempt to kill Lalo. Lalo kills most of the attackers, realizes that Nacho is missing, and angrily strides away from his house.

After opening the gate, Nacho flees and follows Gus's instructions to hide at a motel. After realizing that Gus has betrayed him to the cartel, Nacho agrees that in exchange for a guarantee of safety for Manuel he will surrender to Gus and implicate someone else to the cartel for the attack on Lalo. In a meeting between Gus, Juan Bolsa, and Hector, Nacho falsely claims he was working for a rival drug family when he let the gunmen into Lalo's compound and also reveals that he caused Hector's stroke. Rather than attempt to flee so Victor can kill him quickly to save him from being tortured by the Salamancas, Nacho uses a piece of broken glass to cut his restraints, then seizes Bolsa's gun and kills himself.

Nacho and Lalo are mentioned in the Breaking Bad episode "Better Call Saul". Walter White and Jesse Pinkman kidnap Saul and attempt to coerce him into defending Badger after Badger is arrested for selling meth. Saul believes that the masked Walter and Jesse are hitmen sent by Lalo and attempts to blame "Ignacio" for whatever wrong Lalo believes was done. This is revealed to be because, shortly before Lalo's death, he had revealed to Jimmy Nacho's role in the failed assassination attempt against him and Lalo implied that he believed that Jimmy was involved as well. Lalo had promised to return for the full story later, but he died before he could and Jimmy had lived in fear of Lalo returning to keep his promise.

==== Chuck McGill ====
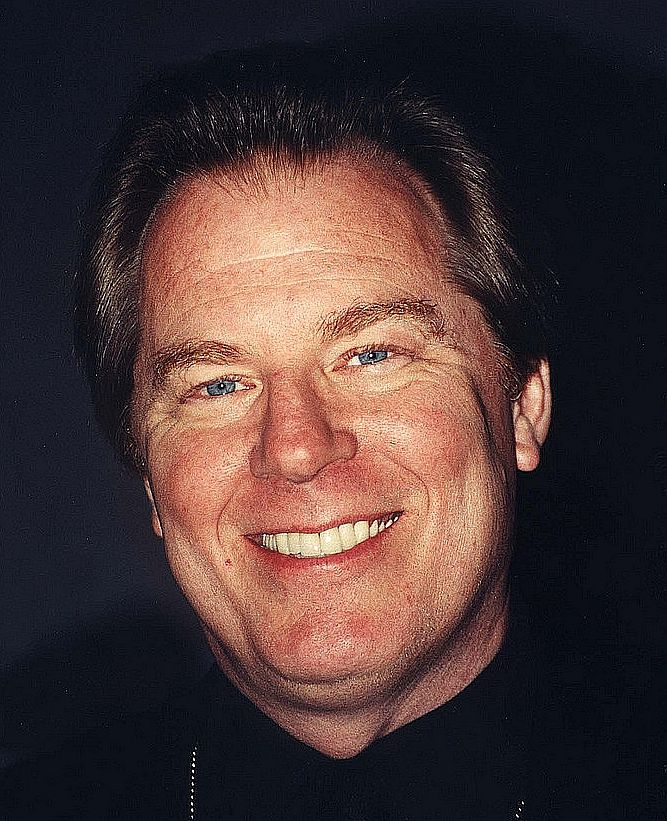
Michael McKean

Charles Lindbergh McGill Jr. (portrayed by Michael McKean) is Jimmy McGill's older brother. He is a named partner at one of Albuquerque's most prestigious law firms, Hamlin, Hamlin & McGill (HHM), which he co-founded with Howard Hamlin's father. A brilliant man who holds himself and others to high ideals, Chuck firmly believes that doing the right thing is the only true path to success. Chuck is critical of Jimmy's background as a scam artist, and after Jimmy was arrested in Chicago, Chuck secured his release on the condition that Jimmy get a legitimate job in HHM's mail room. To Chuck's surprise, Jimmy was inspired to pursue his own law degree, hoping to also become an attorney at HHM. Because Chuck does not consider Jimmy a "real" lawyer, he worked behind Jimmy's back to prevent him from being hired.

Chuck was married to Rebecca Bois, which ended in divorce; around this time, Chuck began to believe he had electromagnetic hypersensitivity, which forced him to semi-retire from HHM. Prior to and in the early part of Better Call Saul, Jimmy tends to Chuck's daily care. When Jimmy discovers potential fraud at the Sandpiper retirement community, Chuck identifies relevant evidence and helps Jimmy prepare the initial case files. Because of the case's size, Chuck suggests that they give it to HHM, but Jimmy is stunned to learn they want the case but not his participation, a demand secretly made by Chuck. Chuck begins to openly work against Jimmy's law career once Jimmy finds out the truth. When Kim is later denied recognition for securing the Mesa Verde account for HHM, Jimmy secretly introduces an error in Chuck's paperwork, leading to Kim establishing a practice with Mesa Verde as her only client. This escalates the brothers' feud, with Chuck deceiving Jimmy into admitting guilt, then using the recorded confession in an effort to have Jimmy disbarred. Jimmy is suspended for a year after he uses the bar association hearing to prove Chuck's illness is psychosomatic, but is not disbarred.

Jimmy cuts ties with Chuck and requests that Howard take over Chuck's care. Chuck attempts to overcome his illness but Jimmy "accidentally" informs his malpractice insurer of Chuck's condition. The insurer threatens higher rates for HHM unless Chuck is constantly supervised. Chuck wants to fight but Howard buys out Chuck's share, effectively firing him. Chuck relapses and in the season 3 finale "Lantern", he kills himself by intentionally knocking over a lantern which causes a fatal fire. The fallout of Chuck's tragic death lingers on to affect Jimmy, Kim and Howard as the series progresses.

==== Lalo Salamanca ====
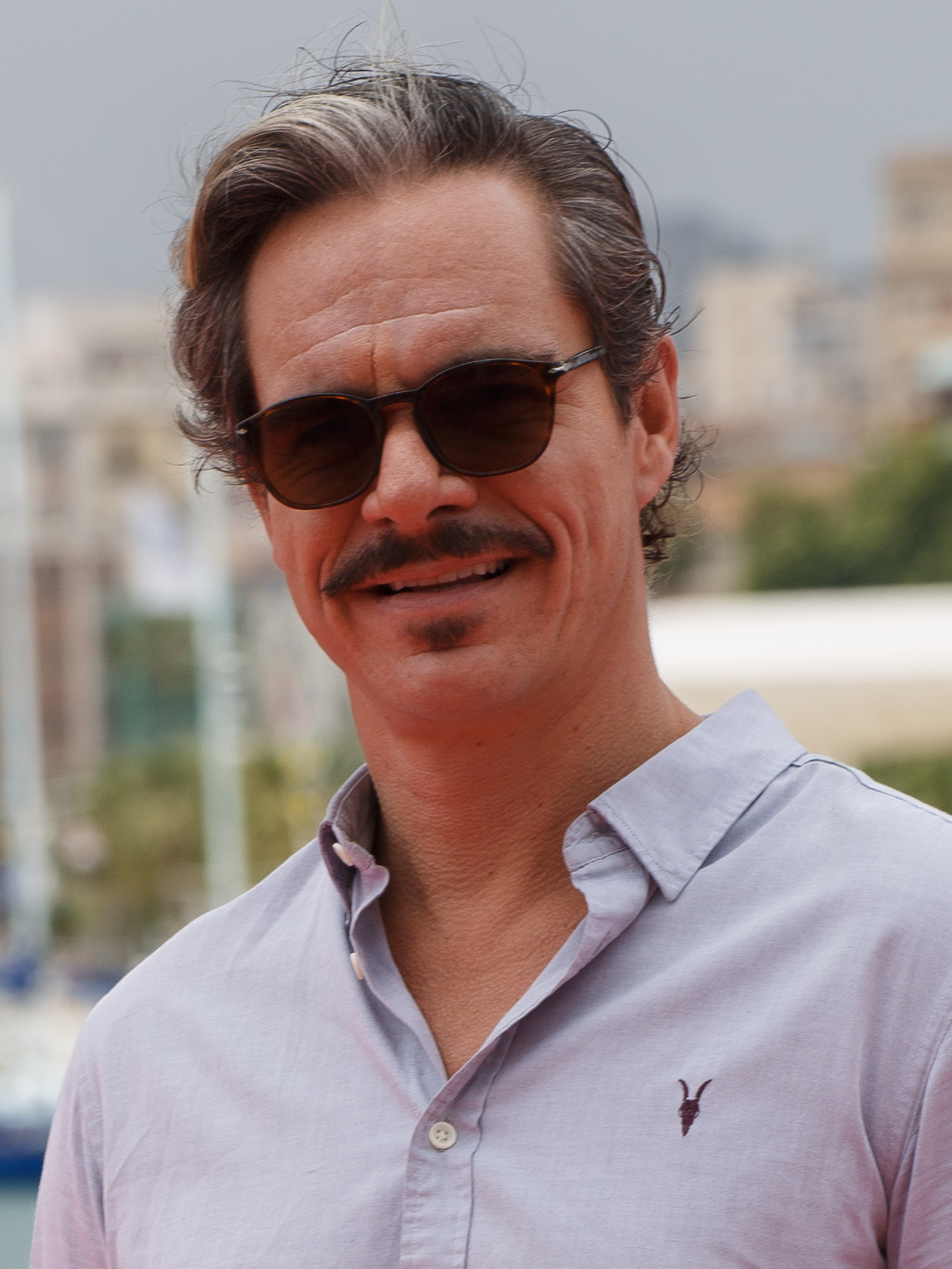
Tony Dalton

Eduardo "Lalo" Salamanca (portrayed by Tony Dalton) is another of Hector's nephews, introduced in season 4 of Better Call Saul. He arrives from Mexico soon after Hector's stroke to help run the family's drug operation, and takes a greater interest in the day-to-day details than Hector did, which makes Nacho uneasy. Lalo visits Hector in the nursing home and enables Hector to communicate more effectively by giving him a front desk call bell, which Lalo kept as a souvenir after Hector killed a hotelier. Lalo thanks Gus for giving Hector first aid after his stroke and paying for his care, but also surveils Gus's subordinates in order to learn their regular activities. When Werner escapes from Mike's supervision, Lalo follows Mike and kills Fred, a money wire store clerk, to obtain Werner's location. He becomes aware that Werner was constructing something for Gus and Gus fabricates a story to explain events of which Lalo is aware, which Lalo outwardly accepts while remaining suspicious.

Lalo disrupts Gus's activities and places trust in Nacho, unaware Nacho is Gus's mole. Lalo allows Krazy-8 to become a DEA informant with Jimmy's help, and Krazy-8 turns over locations of Gus's dead drops. Gus has Mike link Lalo to Fred's murder to get him arrested, but later has Jimmy arrange for his bail of $7 million. Lalo convinces Jimmy to pick up the cash from Leonel and Marco at a remote desert location. Jimmy is nearly killed by the cartel, who believe it best to keep Lalo in prison to protect Gus's business, but Mike arrives to save him. After Jimmy's car breaks down, Mike and Jimmy trek through the desert over two days before reaching safety. Jimmy provides Lalo a cover story to hide Mike's involvement, which Lalo accepts. He intends to skip bail and return to Mexico, but instead of waiting for Leonel and Marco to pick him up, he searches for Jimmy's car. He returns to Albuquerque to confront Jimmy at Kim's apartment, and reveals that he found Jimmy's car, which was full of bullet holes. Kim says passersby probably shot at the car for fun and accuses Lalo of not trusting Jimmy. Lalo then instructs Nacho to drive him to Mexico, but not the original pickup site. In Mexico, he introduces Nacho to Don Eladio and informs him that Nacho will run the Salamanca drug business while Lalo hides from the authorities.

Gus arranges an assassination attempt on Lalo with Nacho's help, but Lalo survives. He fakes his death, then travels to Germany under an alias to find proof that Gus is disloyal to the cartel. After conversing with Werner Ziegler's widow Margarethe and later breaking into her house, he finds clues that lead him to Casper, a member of Werner's construction crew. Using details obtained from Casper, Lalo returns to Albuquerque and surveils Gus's industrial laundry. He later arrives at Jimmy and Kim's apartment. Howard Hamlin had arrived shortly before Lalo; confused, Howard fails to heed Jimmy and Kim's entreaties to leave immediately, and Lalo kills him with a gunshot to the head.

Lalo instructs Jimmy to drive to Gus's house and shoot him; Jimmy convinces Lalo to send Kim instead, expecting Lalo to kill whoever remains behind. Lalo binds and gags Jimmy, then takes Jimmy's car to the laundry. Mike thwarts Kim's attempt to kill Gus, and sends his men to her apartment after she tells him Lalo is there with Jimmy. This allows Lalo to sneak into the laundry. Gus goes to the laundry after realizing that Kim was sent as a distraction; Lalo kills Gus's bodyguards and forces Gus to show him the lab's construction site, filming the encounter as proof of Gus's disloyalty to the cartel. Gus, however, triggers a power outage and kills Lalo with a gun he had hidden in the site earlier. Lalo is buried beneath the lab's floor alongside Howard.

Lalo and Nacho are mentioned in the Breaking Bad episode "Better Call Saul". Walter White and Jesse Pinkman kidnap Saul and attempt to coerce him into defending Badger after Badger is arrested for selling meth. Saul believes that the masked Walter and Jesse are hitmen sent by Lalo and attempts to blame "Ignacio" for whatever wrong Lalo believes was done. In the episode "Breaking Bad" of Better Call Saul, shortly after Saul's freakout, Jesse asks who Lalo is, given how scared Saul was of him. Jesse notes that he has never heard Lalo's name before amongst the street-level dealers and Saul brushes Lalo off as being "nobody".

== Supporting characters ==
=== Cast table ===
Character	Portrayed by	Breaking Bad						Better Call Saul						El Camino: A Breaking Bad Movie
Character	Portrayed by	1	2	3	4	5a	5b	1	2	3	4	5	6	El Camino: A Breaking Bad Movie
Recurring characters
Steven Gómez	Steven Michael Quezada	Recurring	Recurring	Recurring	Recurring	Recurring	Recurring					R		
Skinny Pete	Charles Baker	Recurring	Recurring	Recurring	Guest	Guest	R							Supporting
Carmen Molina	Carmen Serano	Recurring	Recurring	Recurring			G							
Tuco Salamanca	Raymond Cruz	Recurring	Recurring					R	G					
Dr. Delcavoli	David House	Recurring	Recurring											
Gretchen Schwartz	Jessica Hecht	R	G				R							
Gonzo	Jesús Payán Jr.	R	G					G						
No-Doze	César García	R	G					G						
Domingo "Krazy-8" Molina	Max Arciniega	R							G	R	G	R		
Emilio Koyama	John Koyama	R											G	
Holly White	Various		Recurring	Recurring	Recurring	Recurring	Recurring							
Ted Beneke	Christopher Cousins		Recurring	Recurring	Recurring	G								
George Merkert	Michael Shamus Wiles		Recurring	Recurring	Recurring	G								
Héctor Salamanca	Mark Margolis		Recurring	Recurring	Recurring				Recurring	Recurring	Recurring	Recurring	Recurring	
Badger	Matt L. Jones	G	Recurring	Recurring	Guest	Guest	R							Supporting
Diane Pinkman	Tess Harper	G	R	G										Supporting
Jane Margolis	Krysten Ritter		R	G										Supporting
Combo	Rodney Rush	G	R	G										
Donald Margolis	John de Lancie		R	G										
Clovis	Tom Kiesche		R	G										
Austin Ramey	Todd Terry		R			R	G						G	Cameo
Spooge	David Ury		R										G	
Andrea Cantillo	Emily Ríos			Recurring	Recurring	G	R							
Brock Cantillo	Ian Posada			Recurring	Recurring	Guest	Guest							
Gale Boetticher	David Costabile			Recurring	Recurring						R			
Victor	Jeremiah Bitsui		G	R	G					Recurring	Recurring	Recurring	Recurring	
Juan Bolsa	Javier Grajeda			R	G					Recurring	Recurring	Recurring	Recurring	
Group Leader	Jere Burns			R	G									
Kaylee Ehrmantraut	Various			R		R		Recurring	Recurring	Recurring	Recurring	Recurring	Recurring	
Leonel Salamanca	Daniel Moncada			R					R		R	G	R	
Marco Salamanca	Luis Moncada			R					R		R	G	R	
Tomás Cantillo	Angelo Martinez		G	R										
Pamela	Julie Dretzin			R										
Huell Babineaux	Lavell Crawford				R	G	R			G	Recurring	Recurring	G	
Patrick Kuby	Bill Burr				R	G	R							
Chris Mara	Christopher King				R	G								
Francesca Liddy	Tina Parker		Guest	Guest	R		R			R	G		R	
Tyrus Kitt	Ray Campbell				R					Recurring	Recurring	Recurring	Recurring	
Eladio Vuente	Steven Bauer				R					G		Guest	Guest	
Nick	Eric Steinig				R						R	G	R	
Tim Roberts	Nigel Gibbs		G		R							R	G	
Bogdan Wolynetz	Marius Stan	G		G	R									
Gaff	Maurice Compte				R									
Declan	Louis Ferreira					R	G							
Dennis Markowski	Mike Batayeh				G	R								
Ron Forenall	Russ Dillen					R								
Dan Wachsberger	Chris Freihofer					R								
Kenny	Kevin Rankin					G	R							Supporting
Elliott Schwartz	Adam Godley	G					R							
Kalanchoe	Gonzalo Menendez				G		R							
Munn	Jason Douglas				G		R							
Jack Welker	Michael Bowen					G	R							
Frankie	Patrick Sane					G	R							
Lester	Tait Fletcher						R							
Matt	Matt Metzler						R							
Stacey Ehrmantraut	Kerry Condon							Recurring	Recurring	Recurring	Recurring	Recurring	G	
Ernesto	Brandon K. Hampton							Recurring	Recurring	Recurring	G			
Brenda	Sarah Minnich							Recurring	Recurring	Guest	Guest			
Rich Schweikart	Dennis Boutsikaris							Recurring	Recurring		Recurring	Recurring	Recurring	
Mrs. Nguyen	Eileen Fogarty							Recurring	Recurring		R		G	
Dr. Caldera	Joe DeRosa							R	G	R	G		G	
Bill Oakley	Peter Diseth							R	Guest	Guest	Recurring	Recurring	Recurring	
Irene Landry	Jean Effron							R		R			G	
Betsy Kettleman	Julie Ann Emery							R					G	
Craig Kettleman	Jeremy Shamos							R					G	
Sanders	Barry Shabaka Henley							R						
Abbasi	Omid Abtahi							R						
Joey Dixon	Josh Fadem							G	Recurring	Recurring	Recurring	Recurring	Recurring	
Phil	Julian Bonfiglio							G	Recurring	Recurring	Recurring	Recurring	Recurring	
Paige Novick	Cara Pifko								Recurring	Recurring	Recurring	Recurring		
Kevin Wachtell	Rex Linn								Recurring	Recurring	Recurring	Recurring	G	
Arturo Colón	Vincent Fuentes								Recurring	Recurring	Recurring			
Erin Brill	Jessie Ennis								R	G			R	
Daniel "Pryce" Wormald	Mark Proksch							G	R	G				
Mrs. Strauss	Carol Herman							G	R	G				
Ximénez Lecerda	Manuel Uriza								R	G				
Fran	Debrianna Mansini					G			R		R			
Cliff Main	Ed Begley Jr.								R		Guest	Guest	R	
Brian Archuleta	Luis Bordonada								R		G			
Lawson	Jim Beaver				Guest	Guest			R					
Omar	Omar Maskati								R					
Manuel Varga	Juan Carlos Cantú								G	Recurring	Recurring	Recurring	Recurring	
Cheri	Hayley Holmes								G	Recurring	Recurring	Recurring	Recurring	
Rebecca Bois	Ann Cusack								G	Recurring	Recurring			
David Brightbill	Jackamoe Buzzell									R				
Viola Goto	Keiko Agena										Recurring	Recurring	G	
Suzanne Ericsen	Julie Pearl								G		R	G	R	Cameo
Casper	Stefan Kapičić										R	Guest	Guest	
Ira	Franc Ross					G					R			
Werner Ziegler	Rainer Bock										R			
Maureen Bruckner	Poorna Jagannathan										R			
Everett Acker	Barry Corbin											R		
Lyle	Harrison Thomas									Guest	Guest	Guest	R	
Cheryl Hamlin	Sandrine Holt												R	
Jeff	Don Harvey										Guest	Guest		
Jeff	Pat Healy												R	
Buddy	Max Bickelhaup											G	R	
Marion	Carol Burnett												R	
Rand Casimiro	John Posey												R	
Adam Pinkman	Michael Bofshever	Guest	Guest	Guest										Supporting
Old Joe	Larry Hankin			G		G								Supporting
Ed Galbraith	Robert Forster						G					G		Supporting
Clarence	David Mattey							G			Guest	Guest		Cameo
Neil Kandy	Scott MacArthur													Supporting
Casey	Scott Shepherd													Supporting
Lou Schanzer	Tom Bower													Supporting
Guest characters
Wendy	Julia Minesci	Guest	Guest	Guest									G	
Ken	Kyle Bornheimer	G							G					
Cynthia	Ashley Kajiki		Guest	Guest	Guest									
Tortuga	Danny Trejo		Guest	Guest										
Duane Chow	James Ning			G		G								
Officer Saxton	Stoney Westmoreland			G					G					
Barry Goodman	JB Blanc				Guest	Guest				Guest	Guest	Guest		
Stephanie Doswell	Jennifer Hasty				G				G					
Peter Schuler	Norbert Weisser					G						G		
Laura Cruz	Clea DuVall							Guest	Guest	Guest				
Sobchak	Steven Ogg							G				G		
Captain Bauer	Brendan Fehr								Guest	Guest				
Mr. Ughetta	Michael Chieffo								Guest	Guest				
Margarethe Ziegler	Andrea Sooch												G	

=== Law enforcement ===
==== Getz ====
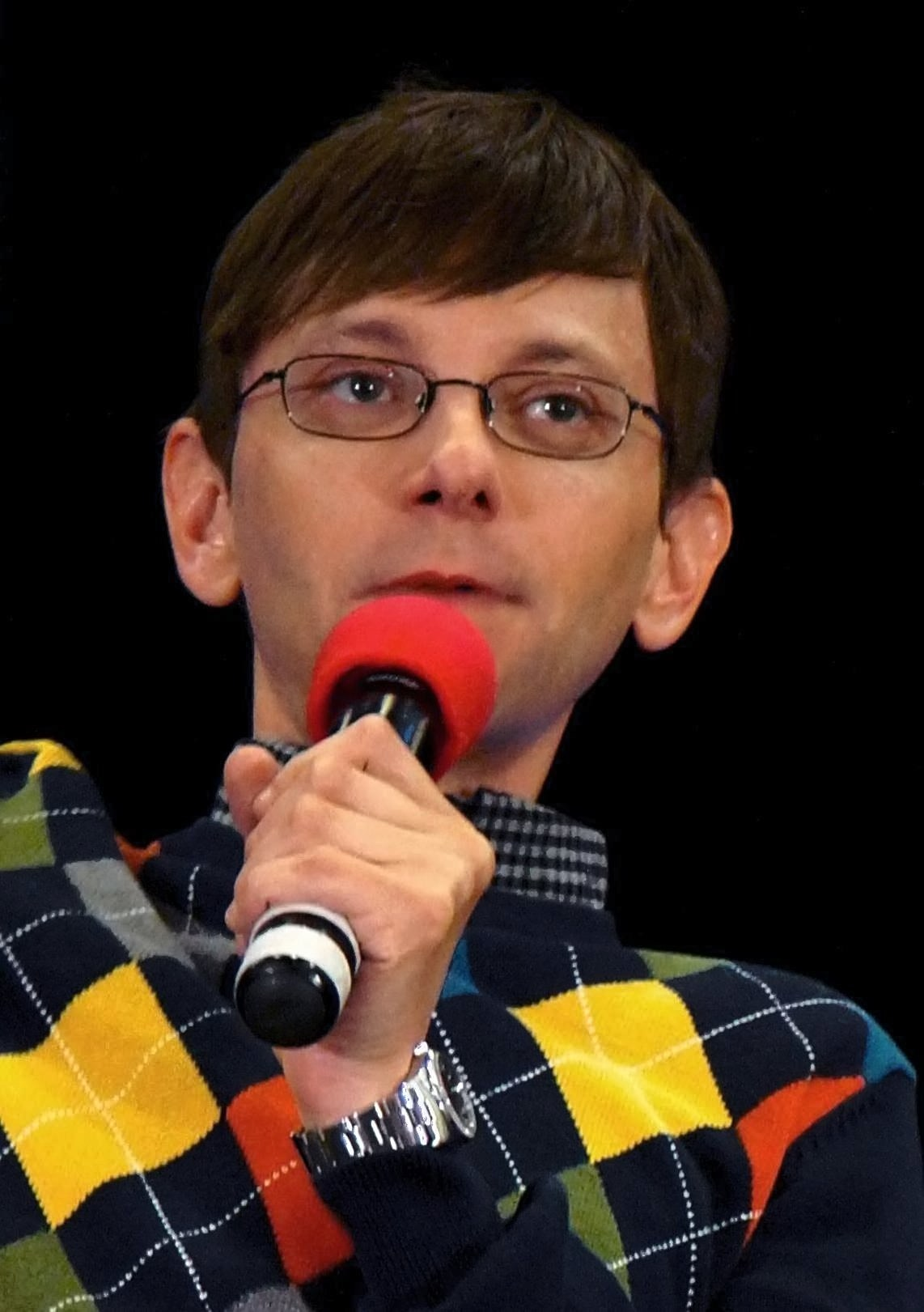
DJ Qualls

Getz (portrayed by DJ Qualls) is an Albuquerque police detective who takes part in an undercover operation that results in him arresting Badger Mayhew for possession of meth.

==== Steve Gómez ====
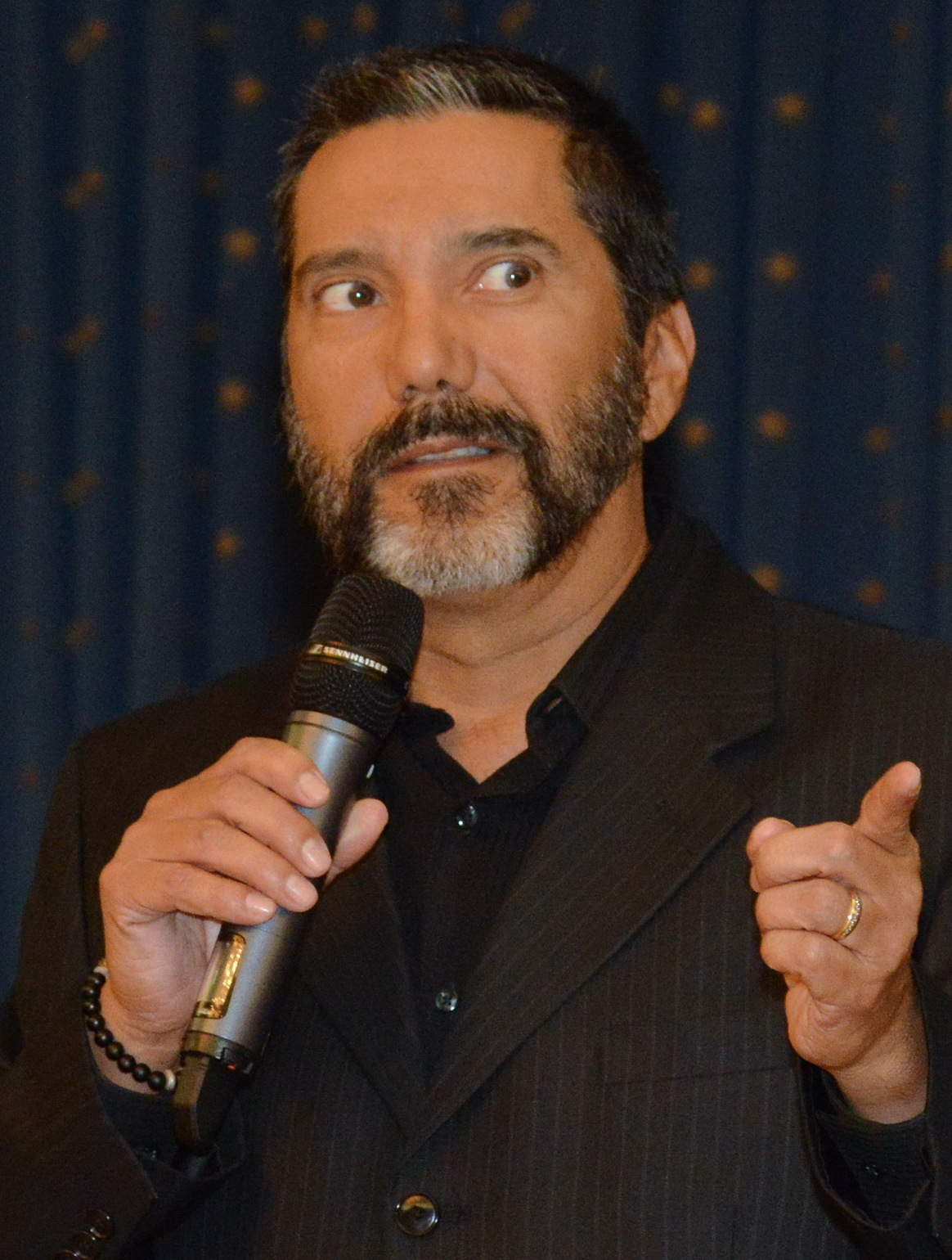
Steven Michael Quezada

Steven "Steve" Gómez (played by Steven Michael Quezada), also nicknamed "Gomey", is Hank's Drug Enforcement Administration partner and friend. He is promoted to El Paso when Hank declines the transfer after witnessing a deadly attack on the Mexican border. Gomez has been Hank's right-hand man in the "Heisenberg" case since the beginning. After the Salamanca Brothers nearly kill Hank, Gomez starts performing tasks that Hank cannot perform due to his handicap. At the end of Season 4 (on Hank's request), Gomez inspects Gus's industrial laundry with police dog units, but finds no trace of the underground meth lab.

After Walt and Jesse set fire to the lab, Gomez returns with Hank to find it destroyed, with little evidence remaining. Gomez is the only DEA officer whom Hank tells about his revelation that Walter White is Heisenberg, and Gomez continues to be Hank's partner through their final investigation, which leads to both the arrest of Walt and a shootout with Jack's gang. Gomez is killed in the gunfight, shortly before Hank is killed.

Gomez was originally supposed to die in the first season. However, when the 2007–2008 writers' strike cut the season short, the writers reworked their ideas and he remained alive until the last season.

Quezada reprises his role as Gomez in Better Call Saul, appearing in the fifth season episode "The Guy for This" in which he and Hank interview Domingo "Krazy-8" Molina after Molina is arrested following the discovery of a drug house belonging to the Salamanca family. Jimmy McGill, representing Molina as Saul Goodman, convinces Hank and Gomez to allow Molina to go free in exchange for Molina becoming a confidential informant. Information provided by Molina leads to the discovery of "just shy of a million dollars" in drug money.

==== Kalanchoe and Munn ====
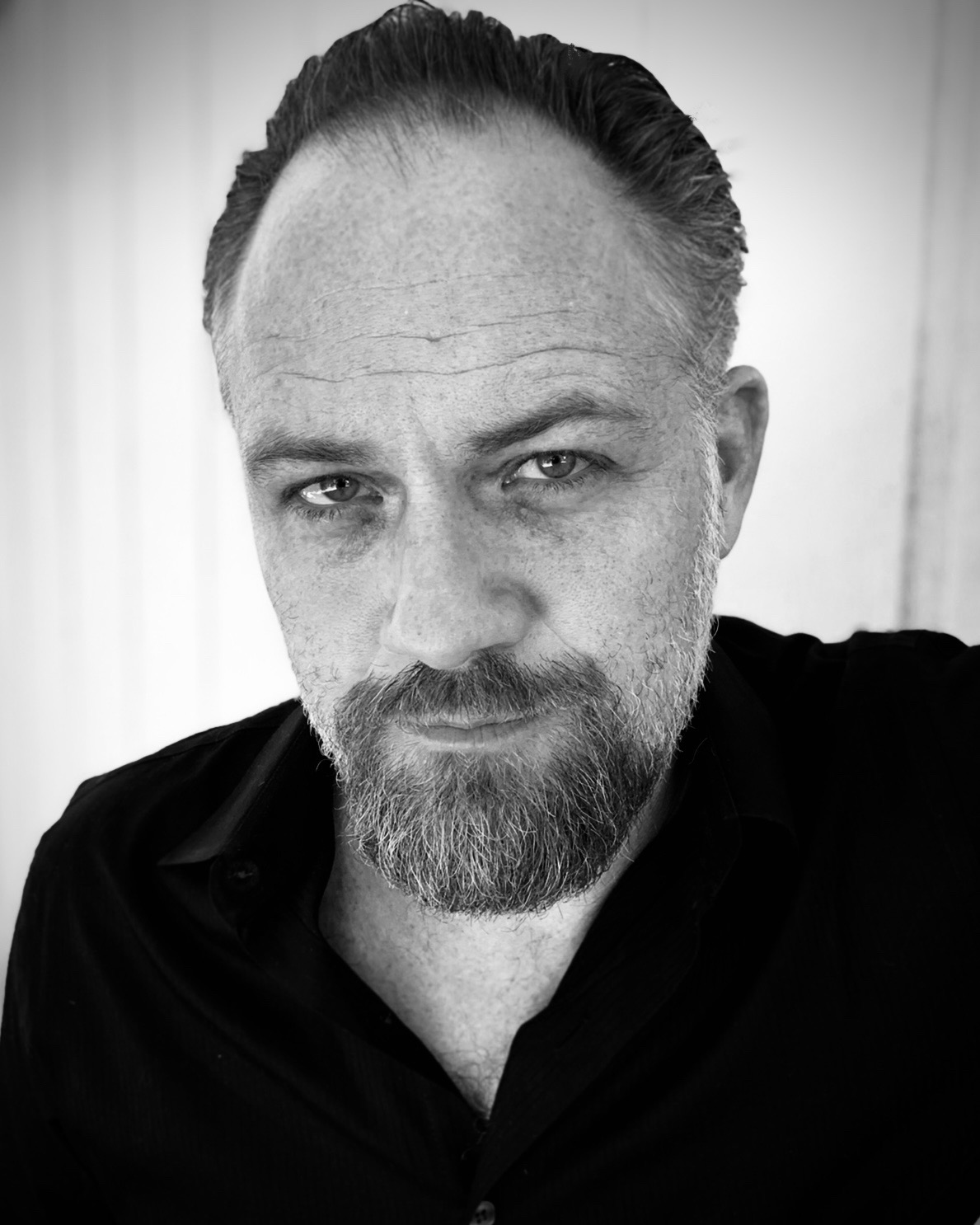
Jason Douglas

Kalanchoe (played by Gonzalo Menendez) and Munn (played by Jason Douglas) are detectives with the Albuquerque Police Department (APD), questioning Jesse first in regard to the poisoning of Brock Cantillo, and then in regard to the large amount of money he has been giving away.

==== George Merkert ====
Assistant special agent in charge George Merkert (played by Michael Shamus Wiles) is Hank's boss at the DEA. He is impressed with Hank's tenacity and hard work, and recommends him for a transfer to El Paso. When Hank returns to Albuquerque after being wounded, Merkert is frustrated by Hank's stalling a second transfer to El Paso, unaware that Hank is having panic attacks and is afraid to go back. After Hank attacks Jesse, Merkert is forced to suspend Hank without pay but tells him off the record that Jesse will not press charges. Following Hank's shooting and subsequent recovery, Merkert welcomes Hank back to work but refuses to act on Hank's suspicions of Gus Fring beyond a basic interview. When Gus is revealed to be a drug kingpin, Merkert is permanently relieved of his duties.

==== Austin Ramey ====
Special Agent-in-Charge Austin Ramey (played by Todd Terry) is the head of the El Paso division of the DEA offices, and thus the highest ranking DEA agent appearing on the show. He appointed Hank to replace George Merkert as ASAC. He reappears in El Camino: A Breaking Bad Movie in which he gives a press conference watched by Skinny Pete and Badger on the massacre of Jack Welker's gang by Walter White and the status of Jesse Pinkman. Ramey also reappears in the series finale of Better Call Saul, during Jimmy McGill's sentencing hearing. He is one of five characters (along with Mike Ehrmantraut, Walter White, Jesse Pinkman, and Ed Galbraith) to appear in each of Breaking Bad, Better Call Saul, and El Camino.

==== Tim Roberts ====
Tim Roberts (played by Nigel Gibbs) is a detective with the Albuquerque Police Department, who works closely with Hank Schrader and the DEA under George Merkert's watch.

Roberts first appears at the White household asking Skyler about Walt's disappearance after Tuco Salamanca kidnaps both Walter and Jesse and takes them to his uncle's house. Hank asked Roberts to take the case of Walter's disappearance as a personal favor to Hank, believing Walter had one of his "episodes" wherein he forgot where he was and would turn up days later.

Roberts next appears after Marie Schrader is arrested and taken to the police station for pilfering property at the open houses she visits. Hank contacts Roberts after Marie tells Hank about her predicament. Roberts gets the homeowners to drop their charges after their property is returned, and he takes Marie home for Hank.

Roberts also investigates Gale Boetticher's murder. He consults with Hank after he finds Gale's notebook and asks what all the notes and drawings mean, and whether or not Gale may have been working in a meth lab. This piques Hank's interest in the case, and he embarks on his own investigation of Gale and his ties to Fring.

The APD detectives' investigation of Gale's apartment yields Gus's fingerprint, which gives the APD and the DEA probable cause to officially request that Fring come in for questioning. Fring complies and then explains his ties to Boetticher, who won one of Gus's Maximino Arciniega scholarships that Gale used to pursue degrees in chemistry. Roberts is satisfied with Gus's explanations of how he knew Boetticher and why he was in Boetticher's home, but Hank remains dubious and continues investigating Fring and his personal and business dealings.

Roberts reappears in seasons 5 and 6 of Better Call Saul where he is the lead detective investigating the murder of Fred Whalen by Lalo Salamanca. Mike Ehrmantraut, in an effort to get rid of Lalo, arranges for Roberts to get the evidence that he needs to connect Lalo to the murder and arrest him for it with Lalo using the alias of Jorge DeGuzman. However, due to Lalo's continuing threat, Gus Fring has Mike help Saul Goodman get Lalo bail, much to the frustration of Roberts and the deputy district attorney in charge of the case. Roberts and the DDA later confront Saul over "Jorge's" fake family and subsequent disappearance, but Saul brushes off their questions. However, he accidentally slips up and refers to Lalo by his real first name, later allowing the authorities to identify Jorge DeGuzman as actually being Lalo Salamanca who has supposedly been recently killed in a shootout at his home.

==== Officer Saxton ====
Officer Saxton (played by Stoney Westmoreland) is a member of the Albuquerque Police Department. He is called to the White residence when Skyler reports that Walt has illegally broken into her house. Saxton reappears in Better Call Saul, where he is called to Daniel Wormald's house in regard to the theft of his baseball cards.

=== Gus's organization ===
==== Max Arciniega ====
Maximino Arciniega (played by James Martinez) is Gus Fring's business associate and former romantic partner. Gus paid for Max's education in biochemistry and chemical engineering at the University of Santiago in Chile. The pair then moved to Mexico and opened a chain of Los Pollos Hermanos chicken restaurants together. In the drug business, Max is the chemist; he cooked the crystal meth, samples of which he and Gus started giving away. These samples gained the attention of Don Eladio, a local drug lord, whom Max and Gus approached in the hope of convincing the Don to join them in the meth business. Don Eladio, unimpressed by these upstarts and nominally dismissive of selling methamphetamine in lieu of cocaine, had Hector kill Max on the patio of his mansion. Gus is forced by Juan Bolsa to watch as his partner's fatal head wound bleeds into the swimming pool, a vision that stays with him. After moving to the US, Gus sets up a college scholarship in Max's name (which Gale Boetticher won one year) and is determined to avenge his death. In the Better Call Saul episode "Dedicado a Max", Gus is shown to have also dedicated a fountain to Max's memory on the property of the ranch he owns in Mexico.

The character Maximino Arciniega shares his name with the real-life actor who plays Krazy-8 in Season 1.

==== Gale Boetticher ====
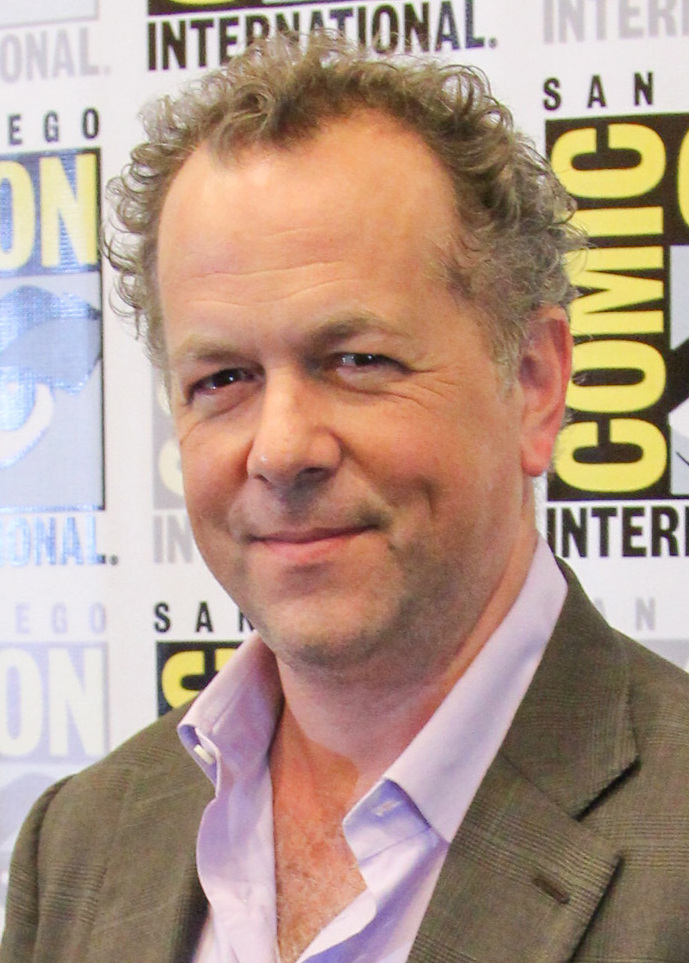
David Costabile

Gale Boetticher (played by David Costabile) is a chemist hired by Gus Fring to set up the underground meth lab and serve as Walt's assistant. He holds an MS degree in organic chemistry, with a specialty in X-ray crystallography. Gale pursued a doctorate in Colorado under an NSF grant but quit because he loved being in the lab and wanted to preserve the "magic" he saw in chemistry. He describes himself as a "nerd" and a libertarian. He is single, vegan, and well-cultured. He is a fan of foreign language music, speaks fluent Italian, and is fond of Walt Whitman.

During the events of Better Call Saul, Gale is a post-graduate student and researcher at the University of New Mexico, and discreetly tests meth samples Gus provides as part of a plan to end his need for Mexican cartel cocaine. Gale asserts he could make better quality meth himself, but Gus says he has bigger plans for Gale. The construction of the underground meth lab, which Werner Ziegler oversees, is revealed to have been done in accordance with Gale's design.

In a flashback within Breaking Bad, Gale selects and installs the meth lab's production equipment. He analyzes the "blue meth" samples Gus provides and assures Gus it is the best meth he has ever seen. By the third season of Breaking Bad, Gale has broken in the lab's equipment but has been waiting for Gus to hire Walt to cook blue meth. When Walt arrives, Gale expresses admiration and eagerness to learn. Walt later needs to bring Jesse back into the business to make amends for Hank's assault, so he convinces Gus to fire Gale and re-hire Jesse.

Jesse discovers Gus's street dealers were responsible for the deaths of Combo and of Andrea's brother, Tomás. Before Jesse can kill the dealers, Walt runs them over with his car, then has Saul hide Jesse. Gus re-hires Gale and instructs him to learn everything he can from Walt, supposedly because Walt has terminal cancer and Gus cannot end meth production if Walt dies. Walt recognizes that Gus is planning to kill him, so he instructs Jesse to learn Gale's address. Late one night, Mike and Victor take Walt to the lab on the pretense of solving an urgent problem only to reveal that they intend to kill him there. Walt convinces them to let him call Jesse to hand him over, but he instead instructs Jesse to kill Gale. Victor tries to beat Jesse to Gale's apartment but Jesse arrives first and shoots Gale in the head, killing him instantly, which prevents Gus from killing Walt.

Gale's death triggers several key events. Because Victor is seen at Gale's apartment by witnesses after he has been shot, Gus kills Victor as a warning to Walt and Jesse to cook meth without causing trouble. Hank connects Gale's death to Gus, the blue meth, and Heisenberg, and obsessively reviews Gale's lab notes, especially a dedication to "W. W.". While having dinner at Walt's house, Hank finds the copy of Whitman's Leaves of Grass Gale gave Walt, which includes the dedication "To my other favorite W. W." in the same handwriting as Gale's journal. This leads Hank to realize that Walt is Heisenberg.

==== Duane Chow ====
Duane Chow (played by James Ning) is the owner of Golden Moth Chemical, an industrial chemical manufacturing company that supplies Gus's drug empire. During Gus's conflict with a Mexican drug cartel in Ciudad Juárez, the cartel enforcers come to Chow's offices and hold him hostage. Chow's captors are later killed by Mike, who shoots Chow in the hand for not telling Gus about the situation. After Gus's death, Chow starts being questioned by the DEA, as he was on Gus's payroll at the time of Gus's murder. Chow is also on the list of eleven men whom Lydia suggests that Mike kill before they can make a plea deal with the DEA (but Mike refuses). Lydia then hires one of the eleven, Chris Mara, to kill the other ten, and adds Mike to the list. Mara starts with Chow, whom he uses to lure Mike into a trap before shooting Chow in the head. Mike thwarts the attempt on his own life after getting from Chris the information Lydia gave him, and then kills Chris.

==== Ron Forenall ====
Ron Forenall (played by Russ Dillen) is Mike Ehrmantraut's contact at Madrigal Electromotive's chemical warehouse in Houston. He is in constant contact with Lydia Rodarte-Quayle, who tells him which containers she has taken off the manifests, which he sends to Golden Moth Chemical Company in Albuquerque, which in turn forwards them on to Lavanderia Brilliante and Gus's lab.

Forenall is arrested after Hank and Gomez arrive at Madrigal's warehouse in Houston and Lydia identifies him in the warehouse. Forenall later appears as one of the nine incarcerated members of Gus's organization who Lydia lists to be killed. Forenall is last seen in a hallway when he is stabbed to death by the Neo-Nazis.

==== Barry Goodman ====
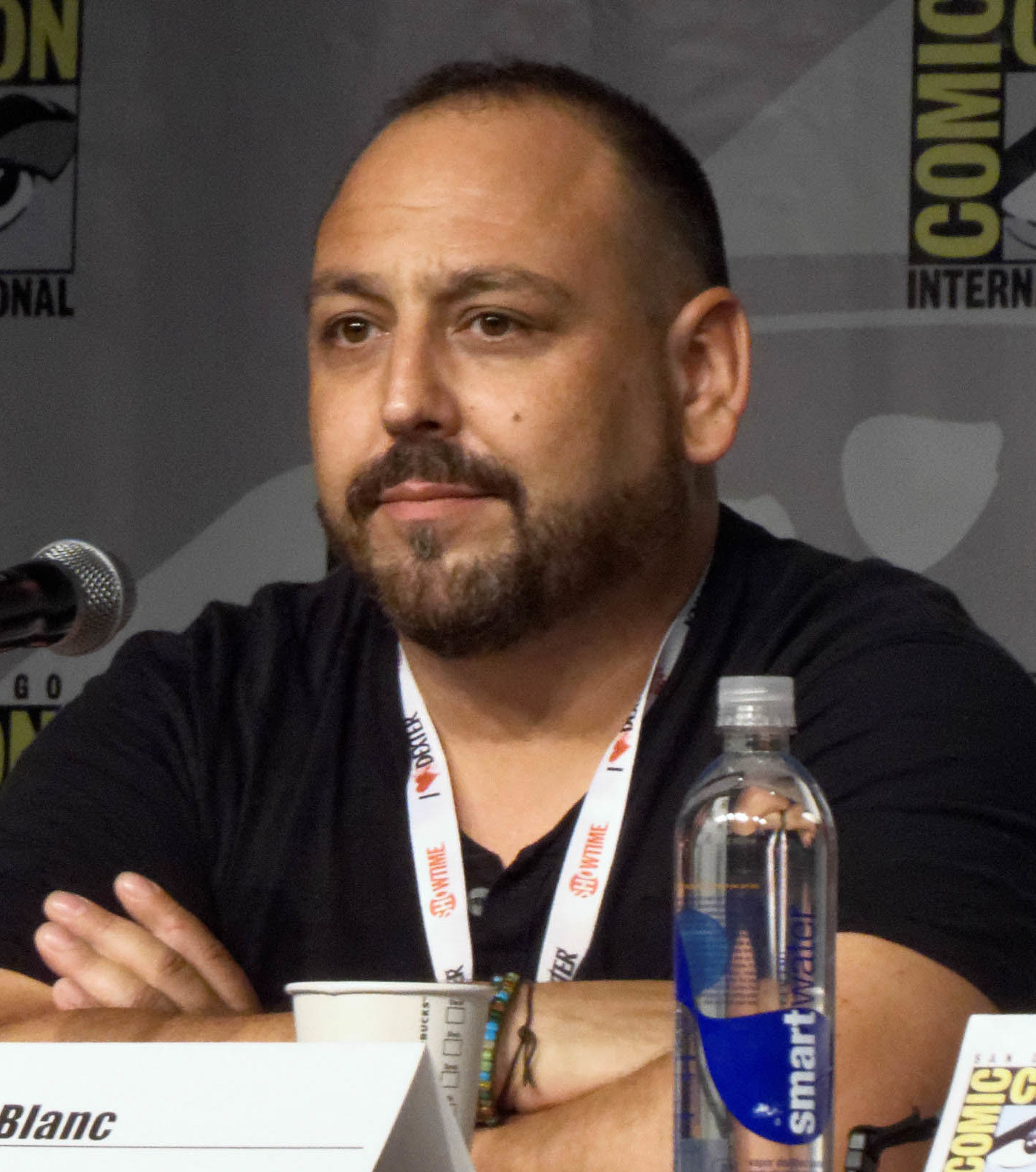
JB Blanc

Dr. Barry Goodman (played by JB Blanc) is Gus's personal doctor, treating him and Mike after the showdown at Don Eladio's residence. He later informs Mike about Gus's death.

He reappears in Better Call Saul as the doctor in a medical clinic for low-income Spanish-speaking patients. Per Gus's instructions, he provides Mike with cocaine to prepare a trap for Hector's smugglers when they cross the border.

==== Tyrus Kitt ====
Tyrus Kitt (played by Ray Campbell) is one of Gus's henchmen in both Breaking Bad and Better Call Saul. He is Gus's second in command at the beginning of Better Call Saul, until Mike Ehrmantraut supersedes him. In Breaking Bad, he takes Victor's place, monitoring Walt and Jesse's activities both inside and outside the lab, after Gus kills Victor. Tyrus's approach is calculating and pragmatic, in contrast to Victor's reckless impulsivity.

In the Breaking Bad episode "Face Off" Tyrus spots Hector Salamanca leaving the Albuquerque DEA office and assumes he has become an informant, which was part of Walt and Hector's plan to lure Gus into a trap. Gus and Tyrus visit Hector's nursing home, where Gus prepares to kill Hector. Hector has Walt's pipe bomb attached to the bottom of his wheelchair, which he detonates with the front desk call bell he uses to communicate; Hector, Tyrus, and Gus all die in the explosion.

==== Chris Mara ====
Chris Mara (played by Christopher King) is one of Gus's henchmen and frequently runs errands among Gus, the mules, and the dealers. One of his other jobs is to assist Tyrus Kitt in monitoring who enters and exits the Albuquerque Police Department and the DEA's Albuquerque office.

Chris first appears in "Bug", where he takes cover when Gaff opens fire on the operatives at the Los Pollos distribution center. He is later shown among the men looking for Walt when Walt goes into hiding. Chris is watching from his car when Jesse exits the police station after being questioned about Brock Cantillo's poisoning and later observes Hector Salamanca leave the DEA office after questioning. He also drives Gus to the retirement home so that Gus can kill Hector.

Chris later forces Duane Chow to call Mike and ask him to come to Duane's house. Mike sees Chris's car in Duane's driveway and senses a trap. Mike creates a diversion for Chris with a toy on Duane's front door, then sneaks in through the back door. Chris confesses that because the DEA seized his cash, he accepted Lydia's offer of $10,000 to kill each of the ten men on the "hit list" of Gus's employees, and $30,000 for Mike. Mike then kills Chris with a shot to the head, the same method Chris used to kill Duane.

==== Dennis Markowski ====
Dennis Markowski (played by Michael Batayeh) manages Lavanderia Brilliante, the industrial laundromat that served as the cover for Gus's superlab. Following Gus's death and the discovery of the lab, the DEA arrests Dennis and other members of Gus's organization. Dennis agrees to stay silent when Mike assures him he will continue to be paid. When Dennis's cash is confiscated, he seeks a plea deal, but Hank refuses, believing he can obtain better information from others in Gus's organization. To protect Walt's identity, Walt arranges for Dennis and Gus's other employees to be killed, and several inmates kill Dennis by pouring flammable liquid into his cell and igniting it.

==== Nick ====
Nick (played by Eric Steinig) is a member of Gus' security team, under the management of Mike. He is shot in the head by Gaff when the latter attacks the Los Pollos Hermanos factory farm. His body is later dissolved in acid by Walter. In Better Call Saul, Nick takes part in many of the team's operations, often alongside Mike and Gus' other men.

==== Rival Dealers ====
The "Rival Dealers" (played by Mike Seal and Antonio Leyba) are two street-level drug dealers who work for Gus and sell meth on his behalf. They involved Tomás Cantillo in their activities, having him kill Combo as part of a gang initiation. After Gus decided to stop using Tomás for drug dealing, the two dealers killed the boy, leading to Jesse planning to kill them. After an attempt to poison the dealers fails, Jesse approaches the dealers for a final showdown and shootout, before Walter intervenes by running over the rival dealers with his car, killing one and severely injuring the other, whom Walt then shoots dead.

==== Peter Schuler ====
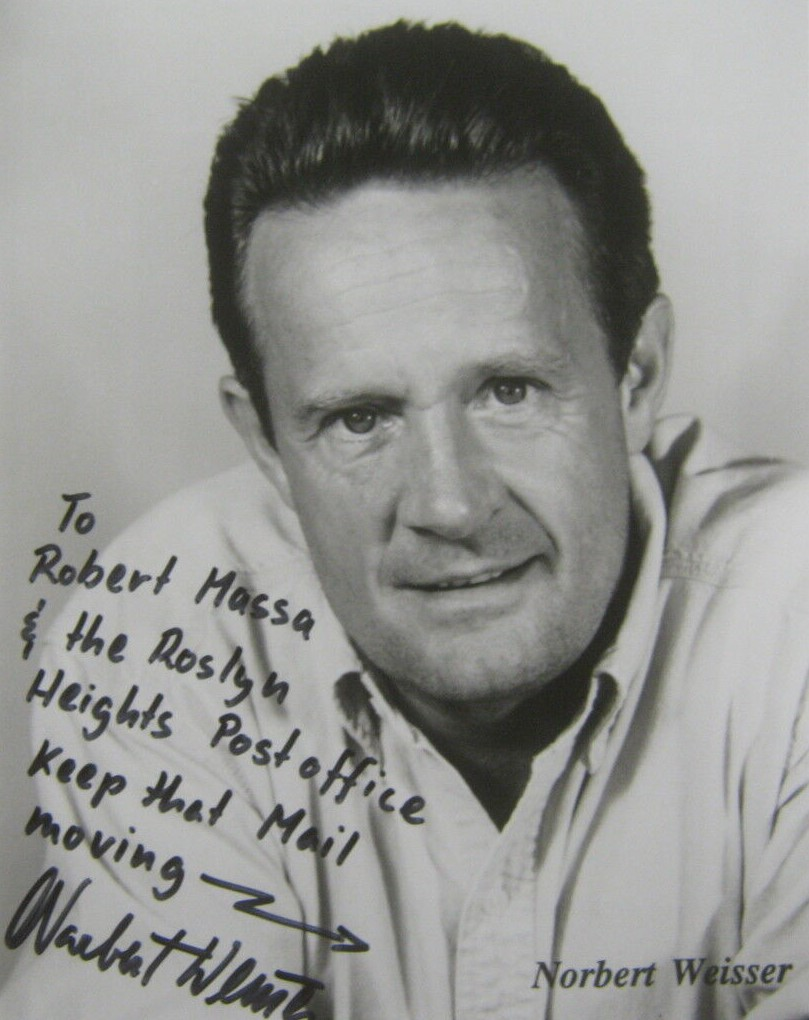
Norbert Weisser

Peter Schuler (played by Norbert Weisser) is the head of the fast food division of Madrigal Electromotive GmbH and a close associate of Gus and Lydia. He met Gus in Santiago, Chile, where they escaped a dangerous situation which marked the beginning of their friendship. He was hired by Mr. Herzog in 1992 at Madrigal. As head of the company's fast food division, Schuler invested in Gus' restaurant chain Los Pollos Hermanos and assisted him in the business of his drug empire.

In Better Call Saul, Schuler leads a meeting with the CEOs of Madrigal's restaurant chains, where he reports Los Pollos Hermanos' quarterly earnings. He later meets with Gus and Lydia in his room and panics about the delay in the construction of the superlab, fearing he will be caught funding for Gus' drug operation. Gus calms him down and reassures him the problems will be dealt with.

Following Gus' death in Breaking Bad, Schuler's connection with him is exposed. When the police arrive to question him, Schuler electrocutes himself with an automated external defibrillator.

==== Victor ====
Victor (played by Jeremiah Bitsui) is Gus's loyal henchman. He appears throughout Better Call Saul from season three onward with Gus's introduction to the story, acting as Gus's bodyguard and enforcer along with Tyrus, a role he maintains with Gus's introduction in Breaking Bad. Victor acts as Gus's front in initial deals with Walter and Jesse. After Walter kills two of Gus's dealers to protect Jesse, Victor takes a near-permanent position monitoring Walter's activities while in the superlab with Gale. Gus discovers Walter's role in the dealers' deaths, and orders Victor and Mike to bring Walter to the lab. Walter makes a frantic call telling Jesse to kill Gale, believing this will motivate Gus to keep them alive. Victor races to stop Jesse but arrives at Gale's apartment too late. Victor finds Jesse and brings him back to the lab, where he and Mike hold Jesse and Walter while waiting for Gus. Walter tries to convince Gus that he needs Walt and Jesse to cook his meth, while Victor attempts to demonstrate that he has value to Gus by showing that he has learned how to cook by observing Walt. Gus unexpectedly slices open Victor's throat with a box cutter in front of Walter, Jesse, and Mike, then orders them to "get back to work". They are forced to dispose of Victor's body using hydrofluoric acid. Though Mike commented that Gus may have killed Victor because he was seen at Gale's apartment and can be connected to Gus, Walt later mentions to Jesse that he believes Gus did it because Victor took inappropriate liberties (such as hastily cooking meth improperly while Mike held Walt and Jesse hostage, in an attempt to one-up them and expedite their deaths) and "[flew] too close to the sun", as Walt put it.

==== Dan Wachsberger ====
Dan Wachsberger (played by Chris Freihofer) is an attorney hired by Mike Ehrmantraut to represent Ron Forenall, Dennis Markowski, and the other seven surviving members of Gus Fring's operation running out of the Lavanderia Brilliante in Albuquerque. Wachsberger takes the money (Mike Ehrmantraut's "legacy costs") from Mike and then deposits it to ten safety deposit boxes at the Cradock Marine Bank in Albuquerque: nine for Gus's surviving men and their families to use in lieu of their "hazard pay" and one larger box for Mike's granddaughter Kaylee on her 18th birthday.

Wachsberger first appears as he and Mike are going through the New Mexico Department of Corrections facility at Los Lunas south of Albuquerque. Dan signs in and tells the attending guard, Darla, that he has brought in his "paralegal" and they have come to see Dennis Markowski. Dan is consistently shown flirting with women, such as Darla and, at the bank, with Dorothy Yobs, whom he routinely lavishes with gifts of sugary baked goods. Dorothy gives Dan access to the safety deposit boxes at Cradock Marine Bank. Eventually, Hank and Gomez discover Mike and Dan's transactions and their safety deposit boxes at Cradock Marine Bank, and Gomez is sent to investigate. Gomez and his agents discover Dan making his routine drops in these boxes, arrest him, and successfully induce Dan to inform on Mike.

The last time Wachsberger appears, he is in the Federal Correctional Institution, La Tuna when Wachsberger is stabbed to death at the same time the nine surviving members of Gus's operation are also killed, which Walt ordered to conceal his connection to Gus.

==== Los Pollos Hermanos ====
===== Cynthia =====
Cynthia (portrayed by Ashley Kajiki) is the manager of the Los Pollos Hermanos restaurant chain's Albuquerque store. She occasionally encounters Walter when he demands to meet with Gus.

===== Lyle =====
Lyle (portrayed by Harrison Thomas) is the assistant manager of the Los Pollos Hermanos in Albuquerque. He is loyal to Gus and takes great pride in his work, but is oblivious to Gus's role in the illegal drug trade. Lyle is temporarily promoted to store manager while Gus recovers after he is wounded in the shootout with Lalo and tells Lyle he is unable to come into work due to a family emergency.

==== Werner Ziegler's construction team ====
===== Werner Ziegler =====
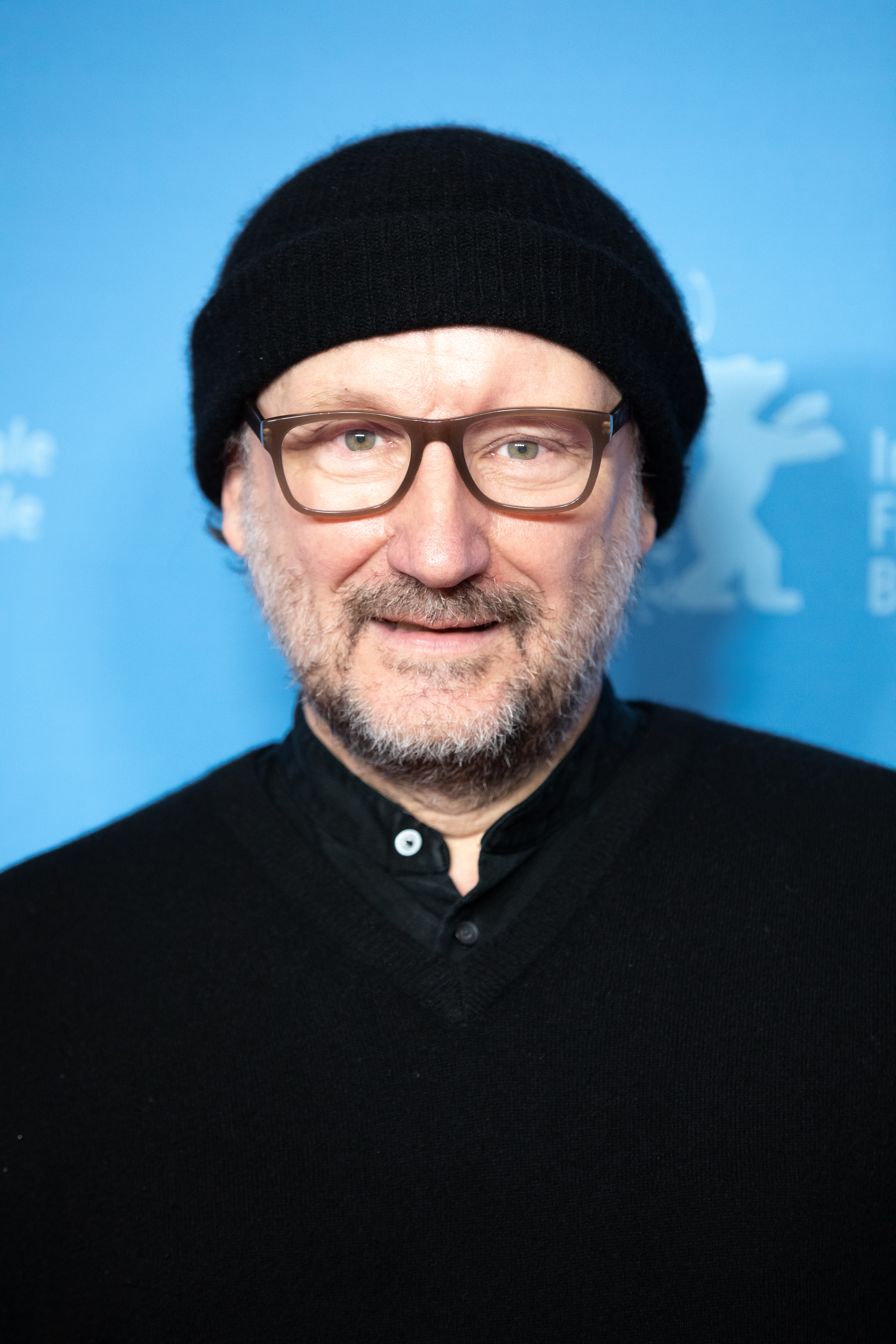
Rainer Bock

Werner Ziegler (played by Rainer Bock) is a German construction engineer hired by Gus to build his underground methamphetamine laboratory. After vetting by Mike, Gus chooses Werner over an overly confident French engineer because of Werner's frank explanation of the difficulties involved in the construction. When Gus and Mike hire Werner to supervise construction of a meth lab under Gus's industrial laundry, Werner employs several other laborers. When it becomes clear the job will take longer than anticipated and tempers flare among Werner's crew, Mike arranges an "R&R" outing to a strip club. Mike and Werner retire to a quiet bar for a personal conversation, but Mike has to return to the strip club to smooth over an altercation, and during his absence Werner drunkenly reveals construction details to other patrons at the bar. Werner later requests a weekend off to visit with his wife, which Mike denies. Werner then escapes by bypassing the security system where his crew and he are quartered. According to the note he left behind, he plans to visit with his wife and then return to finish the work. Mike tracks Werner down at a local spa, but so does Lalo Salamanca, to whom Werner mistakenly reveals construction details before Mike ends the call. Mike asks Gus to let Werner return to work, but Gus understands that through Werner, Lalo could learn the secret of the meth lab's construction, so he says he will send men to kill Werner. Mike says he will do it himself and convinces Werner to contact his wife at the airport and send her home. He promises that Werner's death will have an explanation that satisfies the authorities, so that his wife will not wonder what happened to him, and to return Werner's crew to Germany unharmed. Werner tells Mike he wants to take a last walk to look at the stars, and Mike follows and shoots him in the head.

===== Casper =====
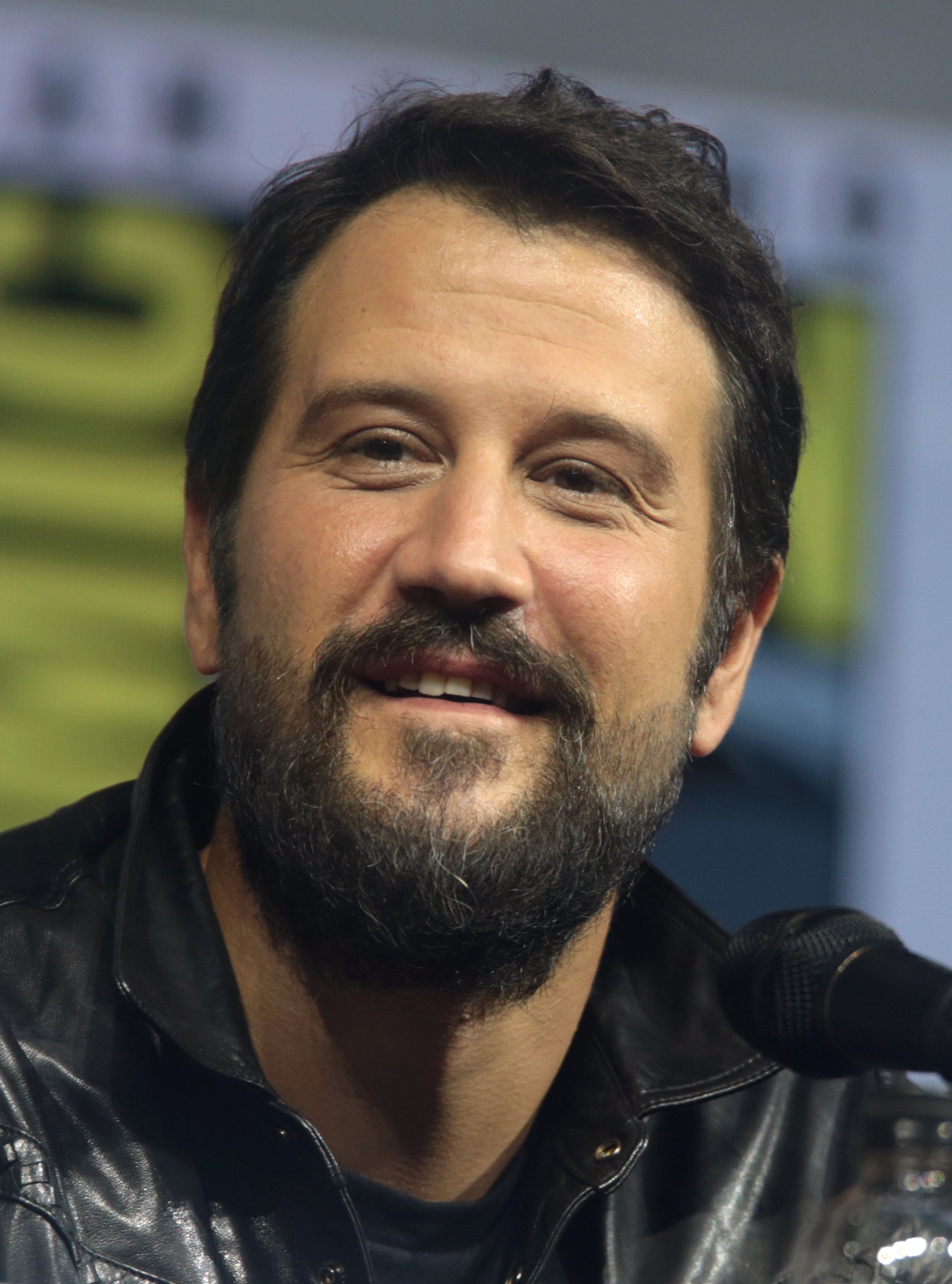
Stefan Kapičić

Casper (portrayed by Stefan Kapičić) is a member of Werner Ziegler's construction crew. As Mike hands out plane tickets to each of the crew members, Casper confronts him and says that Werner "was worth 50 of you." Werner's widow Margarethe believes Werner died in a cave-in, during which he saved his crew. The crew, whom Werner called "my boys", did not attend his funeral, but sent a Lucite sculpture which contained Werner's slide rule and an inscription indicating the gift was from "Your Boys". Under an alias, Lalo converses with Margarethe and learns of the "my boys" expression. When he breaks into Margarethe's house the next day, he finds the sculpture, which contains a manufacturer's label. This clue leads Lalo to Casper, and he soon arrives at Casper's remote home. In the ensuing confrontation, Casper strikes Lalo with the blunt side of an axe, but Lalo slashes Casper's face with a hidden razor blade, then uses the axe to sever his foot. Lalo gives Casper his belt for use as a tourniquet, then interrogates him about his work with Werner.

===== Kai =====
Kai (played by Ben Bela Böhm) is a member of Werner Ziegler's construction crew. He is insolent, rebellious and belligerent. Werner keeps him in his employ because Kai is his best demolition man, though Kai often causes trouble for the team; on one occasion, Kai starts a fight with Casper over a blunder by the latter, and on another occasion he is thrown out of a nightclub for drunkenly inappropriately touching a stripper. After Werner's death at the hands of Mike, Gus pays the construction crew and returns them to Europe. As Mike gives the crew their plane tickets, Kai rationalizes Mike's killing of Werner, to which Mike angrily punches Kai in the face before he leaves for Germany.

=== Mexican drug cartel ===
==== Eladio Vuente ====
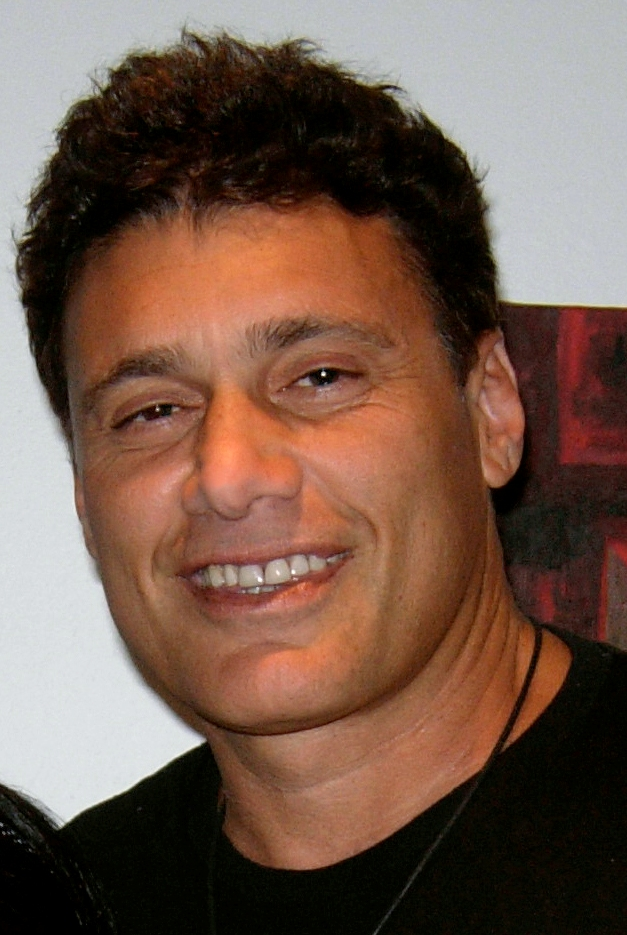
Steven Bauer

Don Eladio Vuente (played by Steven Bauer) is the head of a drug cartel in Ciudad Juárez that includes Juan Bolsa, Hector Salamanca, and Salamanca's nephews. He first met Gus Fring twenty years prior to the start of the series, when Gus and his partner Max proposed producing methamphetamine for the cartel. Unimpressed by their pitch, Eladio declined because the cartel preferred to continue distributing cocaine. After the meeting, Eladio had Hector execute Max as retaliation for manipulating him into a meeting, but spared Gus's life due to an unrevealed but powerful connection to Chile. He then forced Gus to work with the cartel under Eladio's terms, and Gus became the cartel's chief distributor in the American Southwest.

Following the deaths of Juan Bolsa and the Cousins, and Gus's subsequent establishment of the meth superlab, Eladio orders retribution, and his henchman Gaff hijacks meth deliveries and kills some of Gus's operatives. Gus agrees to Eladio's demands—the formula for the blue meth, the services of a chemist, and a 50 percent share of the business—and travels to the cartel's superlab with Mike and Jesse. After Jesse cooks a batch, Eladio invites them to a party at his villa attended by his capos, who toast their new business venture with a bottle of Zafiro Añejo premium tequila supplied by Gus. Eladio chides Gus as someone who provides value to the organization, but periodically needs to be reminded of his place. The capos begin to collapse shortly after the toast, victims of the poison Gus put in the tequila. Gus had previously built up a tolerance to the poison, and intentionally vomited soon after the toast. Eladio realizes that Gus has betrayed him and attempts to lunge at him, but collapses dead into the swimming pool.

Eladio first appears in Better Call Saul through a Season 3 flashback ("Sabrosito") in which he teases Hector because his cash tribute and gifts are inferior to Gus's. In season 5 ("Something Unforgivable"), Eladio meets with Lalo and Nacho and gives his blessing to the Salamancas' plan for Nacho to manage their organization while Lalo hides from police and prosecutors in Mexico. Following Lalo's death in Season 6 ("Fun and Games"), Hector reveals to Eladio that Lalo survived Gus's first attempt to kill him and accuses Gus of having recently killed him. With no evidence that Lalo survived the first attempt, Eladio dismisses Hector's accusations and sends him to bed. To maintain the peace, Eladio splits up the Albuquerque drug territory between Gus and Hector. He recognizes that Gus hates him which he says is fine as long as Gus remembers "who's boss".

==== Juan Bolsa ====
Juan Bolsa (played by Javier Grajeda) is a high-level member of the Mexican drug cartel to which the Salamanca family and Gus belong. Within Better Call Saul he generally acts as the voice of the cartel to mediate issues between the Salamancas and Gustavo Fring because he wants to make sure both earn profits for the cartel. Bolsa sometimes secretly works with one side or the other for his own benefit. When Mike secretly disrupts the Salamancas' trucking route for smuggling drugs from Mexico, Bolsa orders that Salamanca drugs will be transported by Gus's trucks, a result Gus worked with Mike to produce because it gave Gus more power over the Salamancas. Bolsa intercedes when Gus provides a false story about Werner Ziegler's activities and death, telling Lalo Salamanca that Gus enjoys Don Eladio's trust, so Lalo should consider the matter closed.

When Lalo is seeking to arrange for Jimmy McGill to pick up his bail money, Bolsa discreetly arranges for a squad of gunmen to attack Jimmy, believing that keeping Lalo in prison is in Gus's best interests but unaware that Gus had his own plans. Bolsa later oversees the cartel's manhunt for Nacho Varga after Nacho aids in an assassination attempt on Lalo. Nacho surrenders to the cartel and falsely claims to be a mole for a rival gang (rather than Gus) in order to protect his father. He then rebukes the Salamancas, reveals himself responsible for Hector's stroke, then kills himself with Bolsa's gun. Later, Bolsa takes part in a meeting with the Salamancas and Don Eladio where Hector accuses Gus of setting up the attempt on Lalo's life and later killing him. However, Don Eladio does not believe it and Bolsa is visibly relieved by the conclusion of the matter.

Within Breaking Bad, it is Bolsa who orders Tortuga's execution by The Cousins and later places his head on a booby-trapped tortoise for the DEA to find. He is also the cartel's liaison with Gus, and the one who arranges a meeting among Gus, the Cousins, and Hector to determine how to handle Walter following Tuco's death. Bolsa tells Gus he will urge the Salamanca family to be patient but advises that Gus risks losing favor with the cartel if he does not finish his business with Walter quickly. He goes on to say that he cannot guarantee the Cousins will listen to reason and leave Walter alive until his business with Gus is done. He has forbidden the Cousins to kill Hank in retaliation for Hank's killing of Tuco because killing law enforcement officers will bring on more police scrutiny. Gus secretly sanctions an attack on Hank instead of Walter, resulting in severe injuries to Hank and the deaths of The Cousins. Bolsa meets his end when Gus secretly tips off Mexican federales in Ciudad Juárez, who kill Bolsa as retaliation for The Cousins' attack on Hank. Bolsa's name, translated literally from Spanish, is John Bag or John Sack; this is a nod to the character John "Johnny Sack" Sacrimoni from the HBO drama The Sopranos. Both characters are high-ranking members of powerful crime families who are very level-headed, well-spoken, and act as intermediaries between their families and others.

==== Héctor Salamanca ====
Héctor Salamanca (played by Mark Margolis), often known as "Don Héctor" or "Tío", is the elderly don of the Salamanca drug organization and an associate of cartel boss Don Eladio. He is the uncle of twins Leonel and Marco Salamanca (the Cousins), Tuco Salamanca, and Lalo Salamanca, and raised Tuco as a son. He taught his nephews that family is everything and lives by the creed himself. Though brutal, Hector is very loyal. He spent 17 years in San Quentin State Prison but never revealed any information to the authorities. In an extended flashback in the Breaking Bad episode "Hermanos", Hector is shown to be responsible for the death of Max Arciniega, Gus Fring's partner, whom Don Eladio ordered killed after he was insulted by Gus and Max's offer to produce meth for the cartel, which preferred to keep distributing cocaine. Gus loathes Hector, who in turn resents and degrades Gus, calling him "chicken man" (hombre gallina in Spanish, literally "hen man") and a "dirty" South American. Despite their mutual hatred, Hector and Gus are forced to cooperate since each is based in Albuquerque, though each frequently schemes to displace the other.

Hector is the boss of the Salamanca family at the start of Better Call Saul. After Mike Ehrmantraut and Nacho Varga arrange for Tuco's imprisonment by provoking him into attacking Mike, Hector offers Mike $5,000 to reduce Tuco's sentence by claiming the gun Tuco was carrying was Mike's. Hector tries to intimidate Mike into accepting, and Mike eventually accepts $50,000. Mike is concerned about Hector's threats to Stacey and Kaylee and retaliates by attacking a truck transporting Hector's drug cash. Hector kills a witness who stopped to aid the driver, Ximenez, and later has Leonel and Marco bury the witness in the desert. While Hector and the Cousins are preparing to kill Ximenez, Mike attempts to shoot Hector with a sniper rifle, but is stopped by someone unseen, who sets off his car horn and leaves a note warning him not to do it.

In season 3, Mike learns it was Gus who tracked his location and warned him against killing Hector; Gus intends to be the agent of Hector's demise when the time is right. Mike's and Gus's machinations force Hector to find a new way to ship his product from Mexico and he decides to use the upholstery store owned by Nacho's father Manuel. Nacho tries to induce a heart attack by switching Hector's heart medication capsules for fakes containing ibuprofen. Hector has a stroke while meeting with Gus and Juan Bolsa but Gus saves him with CPR.

In season 4, Hector is comatose and Gus arranges for a specialist from Johns Hopkins to oversee his care. Over the next few months, her therapy restores Hector's mental faculties, but he is unable to speak and is immobile except for his right index finger. Gus has the specialist discontinue treatment, trapping Hector's sound mind in his unhealed body, and Hector relies on a wheelchair for the rest of his life. Lalo Salamanca comes to Albuquerque to oversee the Salamanca drug interests. He visits Hector, now residing at the Casa Tranquila nursing home, and gives him the front desk call bell Lalo saved as a souvenir after Hector killed a hotelier and burned down the building. Hector is able to communicate by ringing the bell, which is tied to his wheelchair.

In season 5, Hector confirms to Lalo that Gus is protected by the cartel and enjoys the trust of Don Eladio, and Lalo realizes he will have to tread carefully if he opposes Gus.

In Season 6, Lalo phones Hector after surviving an assassination attempt planned by Gus. Lalo implicates Gus and tells Hector to continue acting as if Lalo is dead so Lalo can obtain proof of Gus's disloyalty to the cartel. Gus and Juan swear vengeance on the man who took Lalo's life, and Hector pretends to be grateful, but his demeanor convinces Gus that Lalo is still alive. Nacho agrees to absolve Gus of blame for the attack on Lalo. After claiming he killed Lalo while working for a rival drug family, Nacho admits to Hector that he caused Hector's stroke, but that Gus saved him. Nacho then commits suicide and an enraged Hector responds by firing bullets into Nacho's corpse. After surmising that Hector's phone calls are monitored by Gus, Lalo calls to say he will attack Gus and his men at Gus's laundry that night. This ruse causes Mike to shift his security teams away from targets considered less important to Lalo, which enables Lalo to approach Jimmy and Kim unobserved. Following Lalo's death, Hector dictates a letter for the Cousins to read to Eladio, in which he reveals Lalo's initial survival and correctly accuses Gus of having subsequently killed him. With no definitive proof that Lalo survived the first attack, Eladio dismisses Hector's accusations and sends a furious Hector to bed, but attempts to placate him by dividing the Albuquerque drug territory between the Salamancas and Gus.

By the time of Breaking Bad, Tuco is out of prison and has brought Hector to live with him. In the season 2 premiere, Tuco kidnaps Walt and Jesse and brings them to the shack where Hector is also located. Walt attempts to poison Tuco's food with meth contaminated with ricin, but Hector saves him by knocking the food onto the floor. After killing Tuco in a shootout, Hank Schrader takes Hector in for questioning. Hector refuses to cooperate and defiantly defecates in his pants, much to the disgust of everyone in the interrogation room. Afterwards, he is sent back to Casa Tranquila. In season 3, the Cousins sneak into the U.S. to avenge Tuco by killing Walt. Mike and Gus intervene and the Cousins bring Hector to a meeting with Gus. Gus convinces them to postpone the murder by telling them Walt is invaluable to the cartel's methamphetamine operations, but that they are free to kill him once he has served his purpose.

In season 4, Gus makes periodic visits to the nursing home to inform Hector about the deaths of Hector's family members at Gus's hands. Gus repeatedly demands that Hector look at him so Gus can gloat, but Hector refuses. In the season finale, Walt convinces Hector to lure Gus into a trap. Hector meets with Hank Schrader under the guise of becoming an informant, but insults Hank rather than giving him information. Tyrus spots Hector leaving the DEA office and alerts Gus. Gus and Tyrus visit Hector in the nursing home, intending to kill him because they believe he has turned informant. Gus again orders Hector to look at him. When a sorrowful-looking Hector finally looks at Gus, Gus prepares to administer a lethal injection but Hector's facial expression changes to wrath as he repeatedly rings his bell. Gus realizes the bell is rigged to detonate a bomb under Hector's wheelchair and tries to run but is caught in the explosion. Hector and Tyrus are instantly killed, while Gus drops dead a few moments after leaving the room.

==== Tuco Salamanca ====
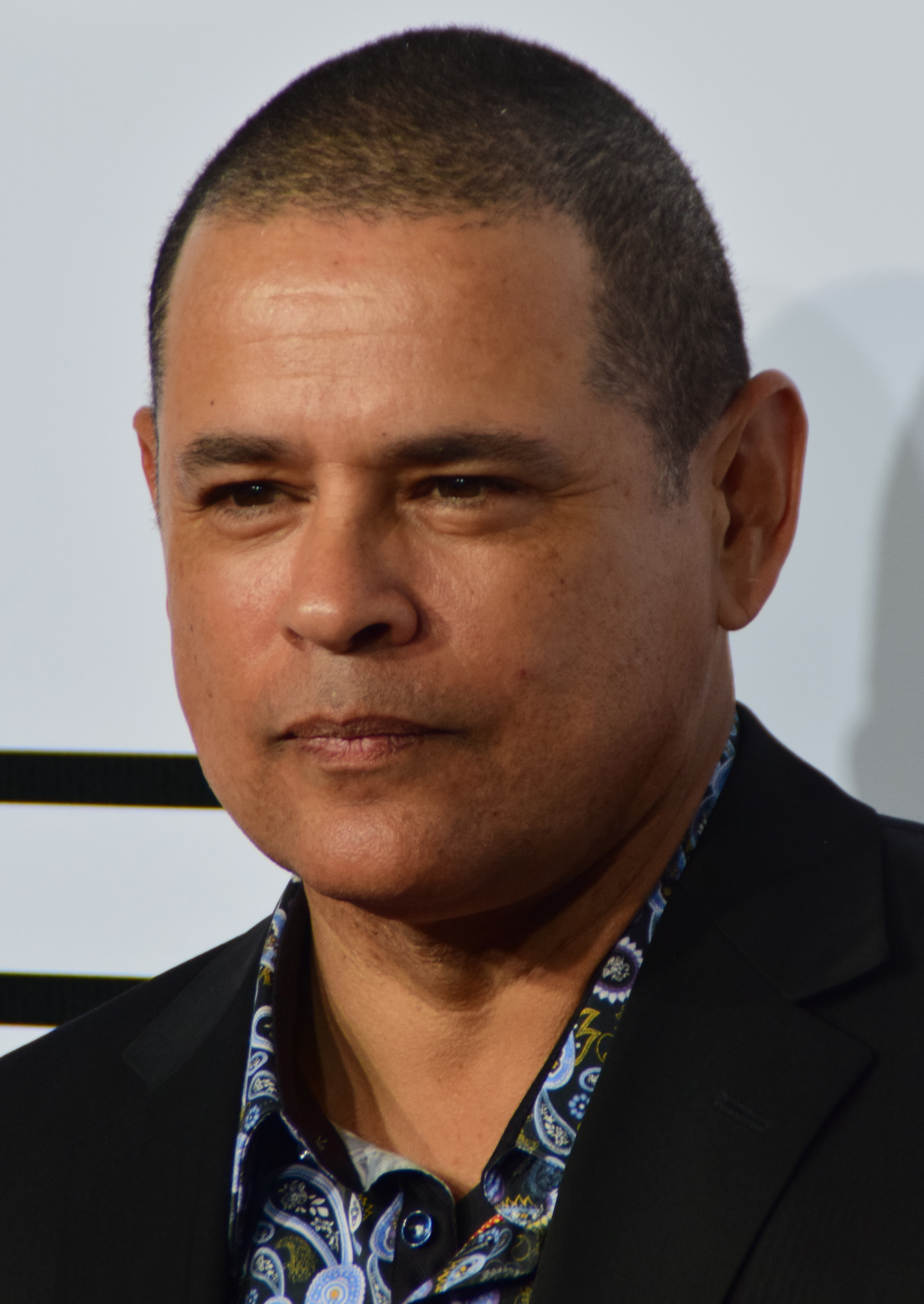
Raymond Cruz

Tuco Salamanca (played by Raymond Cruz) is a mentally unstable Mexican drug crime lord and nephew to Hector. He is unpredictable and prone to violent outbursts which are often amplified by his drug use. In flashbacks during Breaking Bad, it is shown that when they were children, Hector often meted out harsh punishments to Tuco, Leonel, and Marco.

When introduced in Better Call Saul, Tuco is second-in-command of the Salamanca drug family in Albuquerque under Hector. Tuco and his grandmother are inadvertently targeted for a con by Jimmy and two skateboarders. Tuco and Nacho take Jimmy and the skateboarders out to the desert to kill them but Jimmy pleads for their release. Tuco eventually gives in, breaking one leg of each of the skateboarders as a warning and letting them go, though Nacho recognizes Jimmy as a shrewd lawyer. Later, Nacho recognizes Tuco's behavior has become more erratic. Having seen how Mike operates, Nacho asks Mike to kill Tuco but Mike has a better idea: Mike creates a situation in which Tuco beats him while in view of the police, resulting in Tuco being charged with assault with a deadly weapon because he was carrying a gun. Hector convinces Mike to claim the gun was his so that Tuco will receive a shorter sentence. While in prison, Tuco stabs another inmate and injures a corrections officer, adding more time to his sentence. At the end of season five, approximately four years before the Breaking Bad events, Lalo tells Hector that Tuco has roughly a year left on his sentence.

At the start of events of Breaking Bad, Tuco is one of the first big drug dealers that Walt and Jesse approach to sell their crystal meth. After Walt and Jesse witness him brutally beat one of his henchmen to death, they plan to poison him by coating their next delivery of meth with ricin. The Drug Enforcement Administration (DEA) raids Tuco's headquarters before they can execute their plan. Tuco then carjacks Jesse and kidnaps him and Walt, suspecting Gonzo reported the murder to the authorities. Tuco forces Walt and Jesse into Jesse's trunk, and drives to the remote desert house of his uncle, Hector, who cannot walk or speak due to a stroke. He reveals that his cousins Leonel and Marco are coming to the house to take them to Mexico, where Walt will cook his blue meth for the cartel. Thinking Hector is unaware of his surroundings, Walt sprinkles Tuco's food with ricin while Tuco is not looking but Hector foils the plan. Tuco realizes what Walt intended and attacks Jesse while threatening to kill him with an M4 Carbine. During the scuffle, Jesse shoots Tuco in the abdomen. Hank arrives, having followed the LoJack signal of Jesse's car in the belief that Jesse is selling marijuana to Walt. Walt and Jesse hide nearby and see Tuco stagger to Jesse's car, recover his rifle, and fire at Hank. Hank returns fire with a Glock pistol and kills Tuco. Hank's DEA colleagues present him a paperweight embedded with Tuco's grill as a trophy, which he initially prizes but later throws into a river in disgust.

==== Leonel and Marco Salamanca ====
Luis Moncada

Daniel Moncada

Leonel and Marco Salamanca (played by Daniel and Luis Moncada respectively), referred to as "The Cousins" or "The Twins", are twin brothers and prolific hitmen for Don Eladio's drug cartel. As children, the Cousins were raised by their uncle Hector Salamanca along with their cousin Tuco. Hector once tested them when he stopped a boyhood fight by nearly drowning Marco, which forced Leonel to hit Hector to make him release his grip. After Marco caught his breath, Hector reinforced the lesson that "family is all." By the time of events in Better Call Saul and Breaking Bad, they have become deadly enforcers. Their austere, mechanical physicality and virtually non-verbal interaction makes them a fearsome presence, and they kill without hesitation or emotion.

In Better Call Saul, the Cousins serve as Hector's enforcers. They are first shown threatening Mike's granddaughter, Kaylee, when Mike refuses to recant his testimony against Tuco. When Mike is waiting to shoot Hector from a hilltop with a sniper rifle, he sees the twins shoot and kill the Salamancas' ice cream truck driver and drug smuggler Ximenez Lecerda, whom Mike had robbed a few days earlier. When Hector has a stroke as a result of taking placebo medication that Nacho had planted instead of his nitroglycerin pills for his heart condition, the Cousins quickly arrive to watch over Hector at the hospital and refuse to leave his side. Gus, who has a vested interest in deciding Hector's fate as revenge for Max, arranges for a skilled therapist fluent in Spanish to see to Hector's recovery and explain his health to the Cousins. Gus learns what Nacho did with the pills and forces him to become his mole by murdering Arturo in front of him. Gus's men then stage a drive-by shooting to explain Arturo's death, and critically wound Nacho to make the ruse more plausible. Nacho calls the Cousins for help, who come to destroy the evidence, take Nacho to Dr. Caldera for immediate help, and then attack the headquarters of the rival drug gang to recover the "stolen" drugs that Gus had planted there. As their activities have drawn police attention, the Cousins return to Mexico. This gives Gus the opportunity to dismiss the therapist and leave Hector in a state where he can only move his eyes and his right index finger. In addition, the Cousins' slaughter of the gang gives Gus the opportunity to take over the gang's territory for himself.

Lalo later has the Cousins bring his bail money to the border for Jimmy McGill to collect and deliver to him with the Cousins leaving an extra $100,000 as Jimmy's payment. After getting bailed out, Lalo initially plans to have the Cousins pick him up, but later changes his mind and has Nacho drive him to Mexico instead. Lalo survives an assassination attempt plotted by Gus (aided by Nacho) and fakes his own death, leaving the Cousins to discover a decoy body in his home which they believe to be Lalo. The Cousins lead a manhunt for Nacho, but he evades their capture.

In Breaking Bad, it is revealed (in the episode "I.F.T.") that the Cousins were responsible for the death of the DEA informant Tortuga in the episode "Negro y Azul". They had decapitated him by machete and attached his head to a tortoise as part of a bomb which inflicted casualties on several DEA agents. In the third season, following the death of their cousin Tuco, the cartel sends the Cousins to New Mexico to find Tuco's killer. En route to being smuggled into the US, they hide with other undocumented immigrants in the back of a hay truck, and shoot and kill the entire group when one recognizes them by their silver skull boot tips. After Hector tells them about Walter, the cousins quickly track him to his house and are waiting inside to kill him when Mike, who is staking out the house, informs Victor of their presence. Victor tells Gus, who contacts the cousins telling them to abort, so they leave without Walter knowing they have been there. Although Gus gives them permission to kill Walter after Gus's partnership with him ends three months later, Gus is warned that the Cousins will probably ignore the arrangement. Mike later finds a chalk drawing of a scythe outside Walt's house, which he believes the Cousins have left to send the message that their murder of Walt is imminent.

Gus redirects the Cousins by telling them that Hank shot and killed Tuco, and he tells them they have his permission to kill Hank even though the cartel refrains from killing law enforcement officers, because that would draw undue attention to their activities. Leonel and Marco move to kill Hank; however, someone anonymously warns Hank just before the confrontation. Aware of the threat, Hank sees Leonel advancing on him and backs his car up quickly, trapping Leonel between his car and another, which crushes Leonel's legs. Marco opens fire on Hank, who escapes out of the passenger side door and crawls away. Marco strides after Hank, shooting and killing a passerby who surprises him, while another bystander escapes the same fate when Marco stops to reload. Hank then surprises Marco from behind and shoots him in the chest four times, but all four bullets are stopped by Marco's bulletproof vest. Marco shoots Hank twice in the chest and abdomen, but rather than finish him off with another shot, Marco returns to his car for an axe. Hank takes advantage of the pause to load Leonel's empty gun with a hollow-point round that Marco had dropped next to him. When Marco re-approaches Hank, Hank kills him with a shot to the head.

To silence Leonel while he is in the hospital following his leg amputation, Gus distracts the police assigned to the security detail by bringing them food from Los Pollos Hermanos, giving Mike the opportunity to sneak into Leonel's room and administer a lethal injection. Leonel dies, and Mike quietly disposes of the syringe he used, unnoticed by the police officers nearby.

==== Joaquin Salamanca ====
Joaquin Salamanca (portrayed by Gabriel Nunez) is an enforcer of Don Eladio and the grandson of Hector Salamanca. After Eladio and his capos are killed, Joaquin attacks Jesse, Gus and Mike as they are fleeing. He shoots and wounds Mike, but Jesse returns fire and kills him.

==== Arturo Colón ====
Arturo Colón (played by Vincent Fuentes) is one of Hector Salamanca's enforcers who usually works alongside Nacho Varga. Arturo is sent to intimidate Mike into recanting his testimony against Tuco, but is overpowered by Mike. Arturo later attempts to strong-arm Victor and Tyrus into providing the Salamancas an extra kilo of cocaine during a pick up, as he had seen Nacho do on a previous occasion. After Gus discovers Nacho's role in causing Hector's stroke, he forces Nacho to become his mole by suffocating Arturo in front of him. Victor and Tyrus stage Arturo's death as an attack committed by a rival gang, and wound Nacho to make the ruse more convincing.

==== Blingy ====
Blingy (played by KeiLyn Durrel Jones) is a drug dealer of the Salamanca drug ring that wears bling. Nacho tears out one of his earrings for coming up short on payment.

==== Carlos ====
Carlos (played by Efrain Villa) is a drug dealer and enforcer of the Salamanca drug ring who often meets with Nacho to deliver payment and accompanies him in other situations.

==== Gaff ====
Gaff (played by Maurice Compte) is a member of the Mexican drug cartel, serving as Don Eladio's primary enforcer, hitman and right-hand man. He is first seen coordinating the hijacking of a Los Pollos Hermanos truck that is transporting drugs and killing the guards inside by filling it with engine exhaust fumes. Gaff serves as the cartel's representative in a sitdown with Gus, where he rejects Gus's offer of $50 million to cut all ties and informs Gus there will be no negotiation, only an ultimatum to deliver the formula for the blue methamphetamine. Later, Gaff shoots and kills one of Gus's men with a sniper rifle at the chicken farm but stops shooting when Gus presents himself as a target and agrees to negotiate with Eladio. Gaff is present when the cartel is poisoned; Mike garrotes him as he checks on the ill Eladio.

==== Gonzo ====
Álvaro "Gonzo" González (played by Jesús Payán Jr.) is Tuco Salamanca's brother-in-law and one of his lieutenants. He dies while moving No-Doze's body from under a stack of cars in a junkyard, intending to give him a Christian burial; the stack shifts and catches his arm under it, partially severing it and causing him to bleed to death. When Walter and Jesse learn he is dead, they incorrectly assume that Tuco is killing any witnesses to No-Doze's murder, and fear for their own lives. Later, when Tuco finds Gonzo is not returning his calls, he falsely believes Gonzo is working as a police informant.

==== No-Doze ====
Normando Dos Santos also known as No-Doze (played by César García) is one of the head lieutenants in Tuco's drug organization. Tuco beats him to death for telling Walter and Jesse "Just remember who you're working for", which Tuco takes as an insult to their intelligence and an encroachment on his authority.

==== Tortuga ====
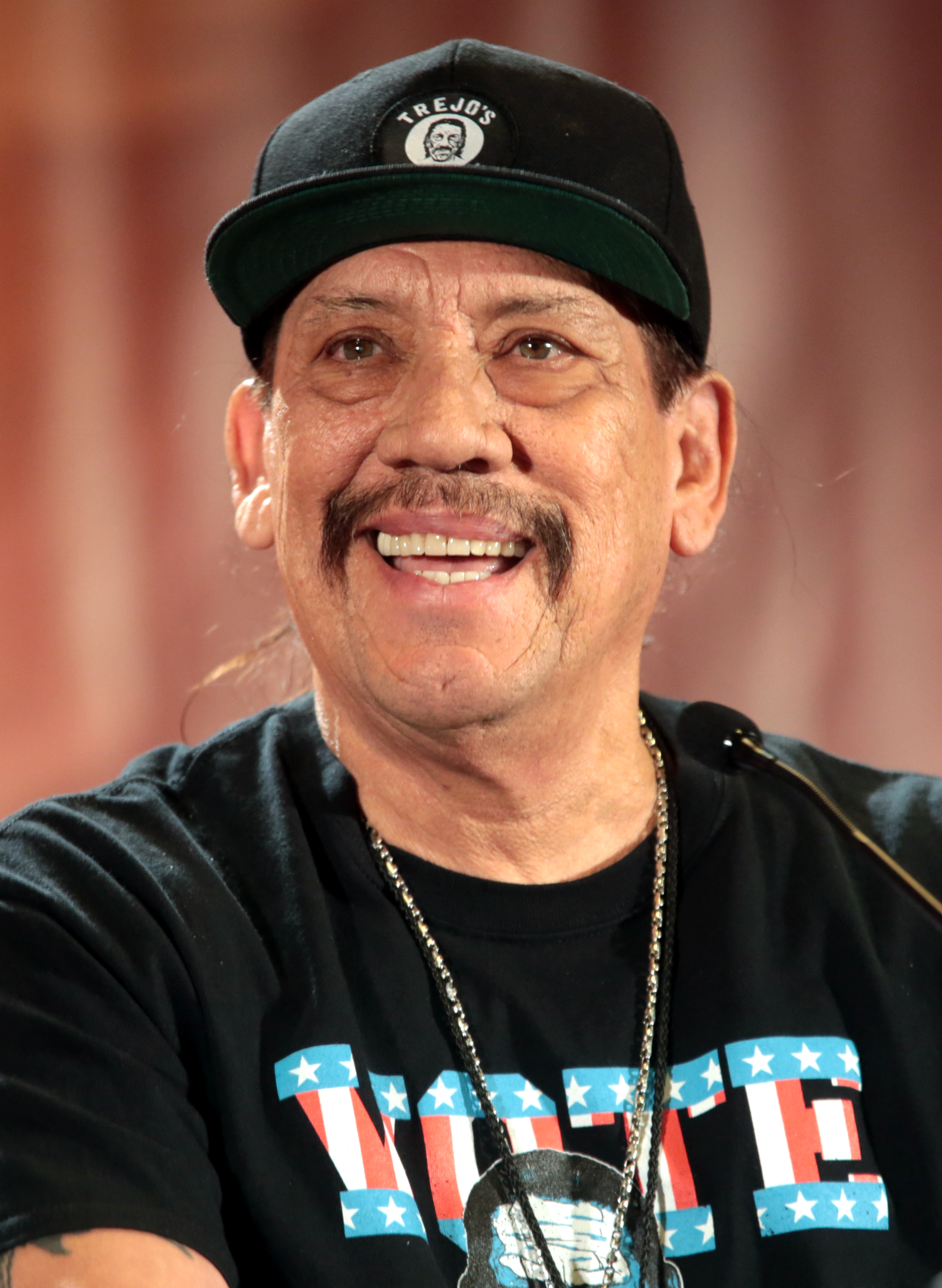
Danny Trejo

Tortuga (played by Danny Trejo) is an informant for the DEA in El Paso on the inner workings of the Mexican cartels. Cartel operatives cut off his head and place it atop a tortoise (tortuga is Spanish for "tortoise") with "HOLA DEA" ("Hello DEA") written across its shell. A hidden bomb in the head then explodes, killing the tortoise, two DEA agents and a Federale, as well as severely injuring several of the DEA agents and Federales on the scene. Hank is physically unharmed as he was far enough from the explosion, but later develops post-traumatic stress disorder. It is later revealed that Tortuga was beheaded with a machete by Tuco's cousins Leonel and Marco Salamanca under Juan Bolsa's direct order.

==== Ximénez Lecerda ====
Ximénez Lecerda (played by Manuel Uriza) drives a truck that delivers supplies for Hector Salamanca's ice cream store, in which he smuggles cocaine from Mexico and carries cash back to the cartel. When Mike decides to disrupt Hector's drug business, he surveils the ice cream shop and a mechanic's garage. The sound of the truck's tires being cut at the garage provides Mike with an understanding of how the smuggling routine works. On Ximenez's next trip to Mexico, Mike uses a homemade spike strip to flatten the truck's tires, then ties up and blindfolds Ximenez. Mike then cuts open a tire and steals the $250,000 hidden inside. Mike intended for a Good Samaritan to free Ximenez, but when a passerby stopped to help, Ximenez called Hector. Hector then dispatched a crew to the location to kill the Good Samaritan and clean up the scene. Nacho informs Mike that he has orders to bring Ximenez to Hector for interrogation about whether he participated in the robbery. Mike intends to kill Hector and procures a black market sniper rifle. Through the scope, Mike sees Leonel and Marco kill Ximenez. Shortly afterwards, Mike is dissuaded from firing at Hector.

=== Independent drug traders ===
==== Declan ====
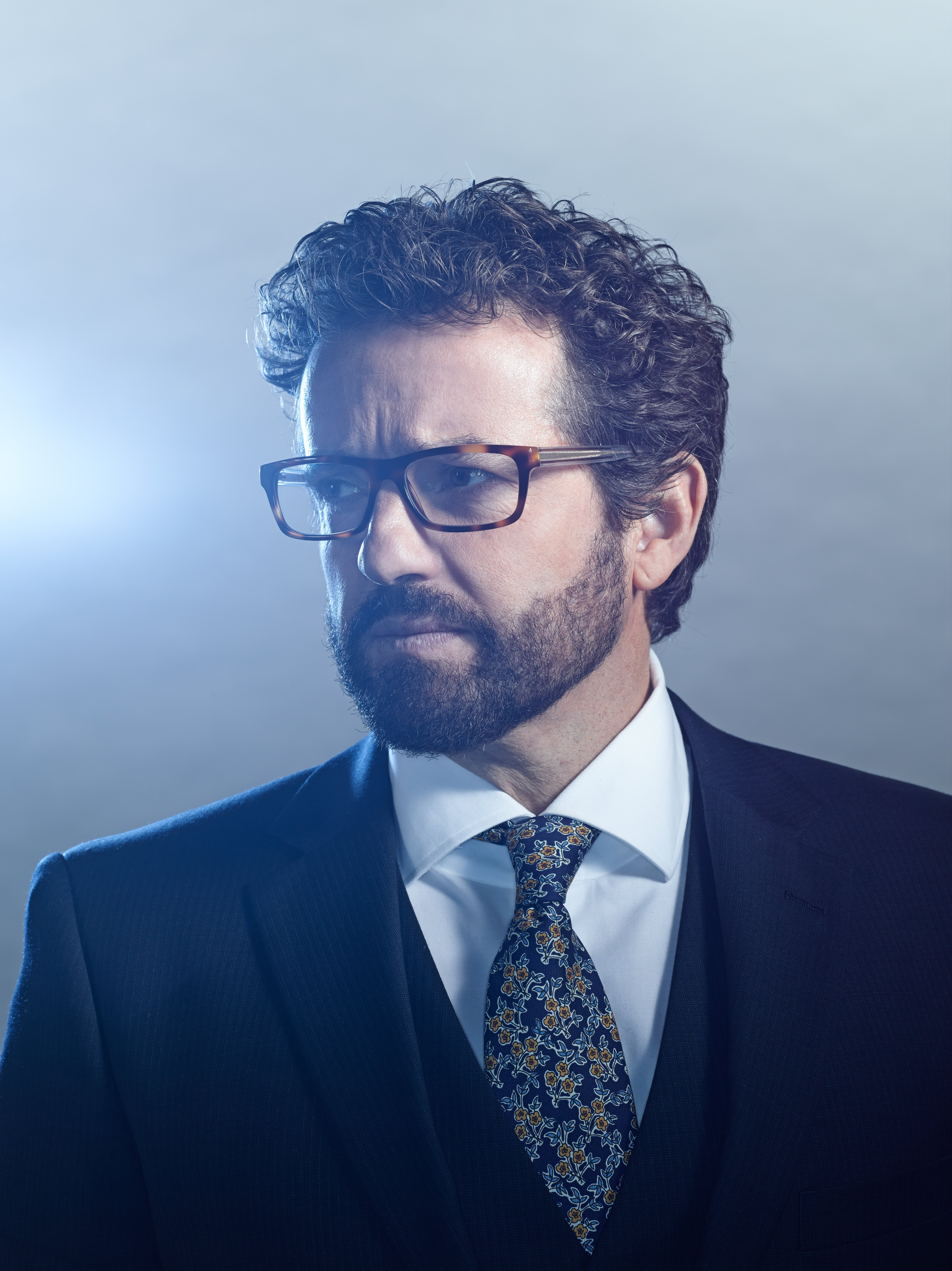
Louis Ferreira

Declan (played by Louis Ferreira) is a meth dealer who operates in Phoenix, Arizona. Mike Ehrmantraut attempts to sell Declan the methylamine stolen in the train robbery, but Walter White suggests that Declan buy out Mike Ehrmantraut and Jesse Pinkman, then take over distribution of Walter White's methamphetamine in return for 35% of revenue, revealing that he is Heisenberg, the mysterious meth cooker whose product is renowned for its exceptional purity. After Walter White stops producing methamphetamine, Lydia Rodarte-Quayle's customers express dissatisfaction with the product, so Rodarte-Quayle tries to convince Declan to replace his meth cook with Todd Alquist. Declan refuses, so Rodarte-Quayle arranges for Jack Welker's gang to kill Declan's whole crew, take the remaining methylamine, and continue production with Todd Alquist as the cook.

==== Emilio Koyama ====
Emilio Koyama (played by John Koyama) is Jesse's former partner in the meth business and Krazy 8's cousin. According to Jesse, they met when they were still in elementary school. In the "Pilot" episode, Emilio is arrested during a DEA raid on a house (at which Walter is present during a "ride along" with Hank) in which the DEA is looking for a meth supplier who goes by the street name "Captain Cook" (Jesse himself). As Jesse proposes Krazy-8 to manage the distribution of the superior quality methamphetamine he produced with his new partner, he realized that Emilio made bail. Suspicious that Jesse ratted him out to the police (although it is later revealed Krazy-8 was in fact a DEA informant), Emilio and Krazy-8 force Jesse to lead them to his new partner. Emilio recognizes Walter from the time of his arrest and suggests killing both Walter and Jesse. Walter convinces them to spare their lives if he teaches them his meth formula. While the three are in the RV, Walt deliberately causes a chemical explosion and flees, trapping Emilio and Krazy-8 inside the RV with deadly phosphine gas. Emilio dies and Jesse subsequently disposes of his body by dissolving it in hydrofluoric acid, albeit disastrously as it also dissolves Jesse's bathtub and the floor below. In "Better Call Saul", Jesse mentions that Saul Goodman got Emilio out of serious legal trouble twice as proof of why he and Walt should hire Saul to help Badger.

In Better Call Saul's "Waterworks", Emilio visits Saul Goodman's office in 2004 for legal help just as Kim Wexler is leaving after she and Saul sign their divorce papers.

==== Krazy-8 ====
Domingo Gallardo "Krazy-8" Molina (played by Max Arciniega) is a meth distributor associated with his cousin Emilio and Jesse Pinkman and is the first antagonist of the opening three episodes of the series. Krazy-8 becomes suspicious of Jesse when Jesse attempts to sell him a new product after Emilio's arrest, and forces Jesse to take him to Jesse's new partner. Krazy-8 and Emilio suspect Walter is involved with law enforcement and appear intent on killing him until Walter offers to teach Krazy-8 his drug formula. While mixing chemicals, Walter creates a small explosion that produces phosphine gas, which appears to kill both Emilio and Krazy-8. Emilio dies, but Krazy-8 regains consciousness, prompting Jesse and Walt to imprison him in Jesse's basement for several days as they ponder what to do with him. Walt begins to bond with Krazy-8, feeding him and sharing beers; Krazy-8 is the first person Walt tells about his cancer. Walt is nearly convinced to free him, but realizes that Krazy-8 plans to attack him with a concealed piece of broken Fiestaware, and strangles him to death. Later, in episode 7 of the season, it is implied that Walter disposed of Krazy-8's body with hydrofluoric acid in the same manner as Emilio's, when Jesse states that two bodies had been flushed down the house's toilet. From that point on, throughout the series, Walt makes sandwiches without bread crusts, adopting Krazy-8's manner of eating sandwiches. Following the discovery of his car in the desert, it is revealed by Hank Schrader and Steven Gomez that Krazy-8 is actually the informant who had led them to Emilio and Jesse's lab in the first place during the ride-along that had triggered Walt's interest in the drug trade. The discovery of a sample of Walt's meth hidden in Krazy-8's car alerts them to the existence of new players in town. In season two, Hank states that Tuco Salamanca is suspected of murdering Krazy-8, but Gomez states that they could not prove it.

Krazy-8 also appears in Better Call Saul as part of the Salamanca drug ring. Initially one of the dealers, he takes on a lieutenant role under Nacho after Hector Salamanca has a stroke and becomes paralyzed, and continues in this position when Lalo Salamanca arrives from Mexico to oversee operations. Lalo is the one to nickname Domingo "Ocho Loco" (Spanish for "Crazy Eight") based on his misplaying of a hand during a poker game. Krazy-8 is arrested when one of the Salamanca drug houses is discovered by the local police, leading Nacho to seek Jimmy McGill's legal services to help free him. Jimmy, as Saul Goodman, creates a ploy that draws Hank to see Domingo, and through Saul's machinations, secures Domingo's release by assuring that he will be Hank's confidential informant. Lalo subsequently uses Krazy-8 to sabotage Gus Fring's rival drug operations until Mike gets Lalo arrested for murder.

=== Aryan Brotherhood ===
==== Jack Welker ====
Jack Welker (played by Michael Bowen) is Todd Alquist's uncle and the leader of a Neo-Nazi gang. Walter pays Jack to kill Mike's crew after they are arrested, because Walt fears they can identify him as a member of Gus's operation and may enter into plea bargains as government informants since the DEA has stopped the payments Gus had arranged for their families. Jack's gang kills nine of Mike's men and their lawyer Dan Wachsberger in three prisons, within two minutes, which prevents any of them from warning the others or law enforcement authorities from adding extra protection. Jack also heads his gang's massacre of Declan's at Lydia's behest after Declan refuses Lydia's request to replace his shoddy meth cook with Todd.

Jack and his crew are later hired by Walt to kill Jesse in exchange for teaching Todd to cook meth one more time. When Walt is lured to the money's location by Jesse, he calls Jack's crew for help, but calls it off when he sees Hank and Gomez are with Jesse. Nonetheless, Jack and his crew arrive and engage in a shootout with Hank and Gomez. Following the shootout, in which Gomez is killed, Jack murders Hank and abducts Jesse (initially to kill him, then to force him to work as an enslaved meth cook). Jack then orders the gang to dig up Walt's barrels of money (containing approximately $80 million), but at Todd's behest he leaves Walt alive with one barrel (about $11 million).

Several months later, Walt arrives at Jack's hideout and remotely activates an M60 machine gun hidden in his car's trunk; the massive bullet spray kills Jack's entire gang except for Jack and Todd. An enraged Jesse strangles Todd with the chain that connects his shackles. A mortally wounded Jack offers to trade the money he took from Walt for his life, but Walt coldly shoots him in mid-sentence, in the same manner that Jack shot Hank.

==== Kenny ====
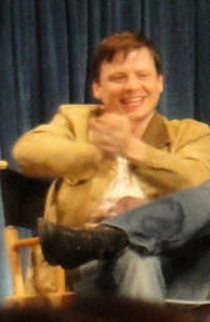
Kevin Rankin

Kenny (Kevin Rankin) is Jack's protégé and second-in-command, and the Brotherhood's tech expert.

Kenny is one of the gang members killed in Walter White's M60 machine gun attack. He also appears in El Camino: A Breaking Bad Movie, in which he is seen in a flashback as he taunts Jesse during Neil Kandy's construction of the tether that restrains Jesse while he is forced to cook meth for the Brotherhood.

=== Jesse's friends and family ===
==== Andrea Cantillo ====
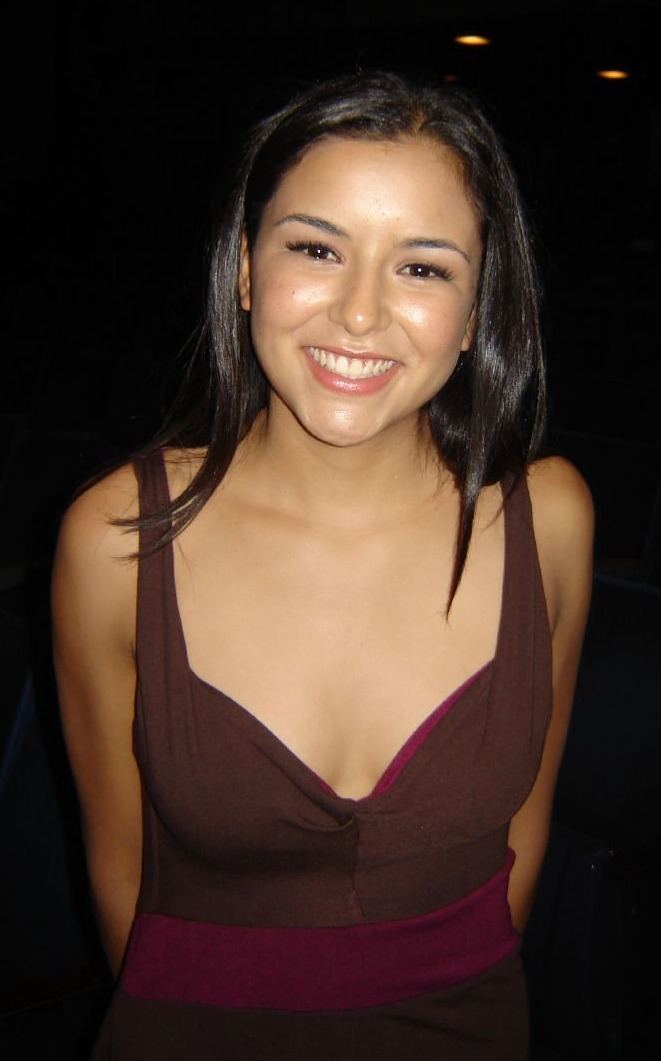
Emily Rios

Andrea Cantillo (played by Emily Rios) is a love interest of Jesse Pinkman's. She is a recovering meth addict and single mother to a young son named Brock (played by Ian Posada). Jesse meets her at a drug addicts' support group meeting and initially tries to get her to relapse so she will become a customer of his, but he reverses course when he learns she has a young son to care for. He engages in a romantic relationship with her, but ends it when he discovers that the 11-year-old boy who killed his friend "Combo" is her younger brother Tomas Cantillo (played by Angelo Martinez). After the break-up, she confronts Jesse at his home about a large sum of money he had left for her at her home. He tells her the money is for her to move out of her bad neighborhood and to help raise her son. Saul continues to deliver money to her, in her new home, on Jesse's behalf. In Season 4, she and Jesse reunite. When Brock is poisoned, Jesse rushes to the hospital and stays there until the doctors notify him that Brock will survive. In Season 5, Walt manipulates Jesse into leaving her, by advising Jesse that he would have to be honest with her about all the crimes he has committed. While Jesse does send them off again, he continues providing for them financially. Later in the season, Andrea is again contacted by Walt in a failed attempt to lure Jesse out of DEA protection. Walter assigns Jack to watch over the house in case Jesse makes an appearance. Subsequently, Jack uses her as leverage against Jesse, who is kept prisoner by him and his team to cook meth for them. After Jesse attempts to escape from Jack's gang, Todd shoots and kills Andrea while Jesse is forced to watch.

==== Brock Cantillo ====
Brock Cantillo (played by Ian Posada) is Andrea's seven-year-old son. Andrea is a recovering meth addict and single mother. Jesse meets her at a drug addicts' twelve-step program meeting and initially tries to get her to relapse, so she will become his customer, but he reverses course when he meets Brock and realizes she has a young son to care for. Jesse engages in a romantic relationship with Andrea, but ends it when he discovers that the 11-year-old boy who killed his friend "Combo" is her younger brother Tomas Cantillo (played by Angelo Martinez); however, Jesse continues to offer financial support to Andrea and Brock.

In Season 4, Andrea and Jesse reunite. When Brock gets sick, Jesse rushes to the hospital, and warns the doctors about a possible ricin poisoning, then stays there until the doctors notify him that Brock will survive (it turns out that the boy was indeed poisoned, although not with ricin but with lily of the valley; still, this timely warning put them on the right track). Jesse fears Brock was poisoned by a ricin cigarette Jesse was carrying. Walt tries to convince Jesse that Gus poisoned Brock. This manipulation by Walt renews Jesse's loyalty to him rather than to Gus. In the final season's episode "Confessions" Jesse suddenly changes his mind about leaving town and assuming a new identity when he realizes Walt poisoned Brock. Jesse then rushes to Walt's house and attempts to burn it down, but is intercepted by Hank.

Subsequently, Brock and Andrea are used as leverage against Jesse, who is kept prisoner by Todd and Jack's gang to cook meth for them. After Jesse attempts to escape, Todd shoots and kills Andrea while Jesse is forced to watch; Jesse is threatened with Brock's death if he attempts to escape again.

In El Camino: A Breaking Bad Movie, Jesse prepares to leave for a new life in Alaska and gives Ed a letter for Brock, who is the only person to whom he wants to say goodbye. After reading it, Ed promises to mail it from Mexico City the following month, ensuring that Brock will get it and that it cannot be traced to Jesse in Alaska.

==== Jane Margolis ====
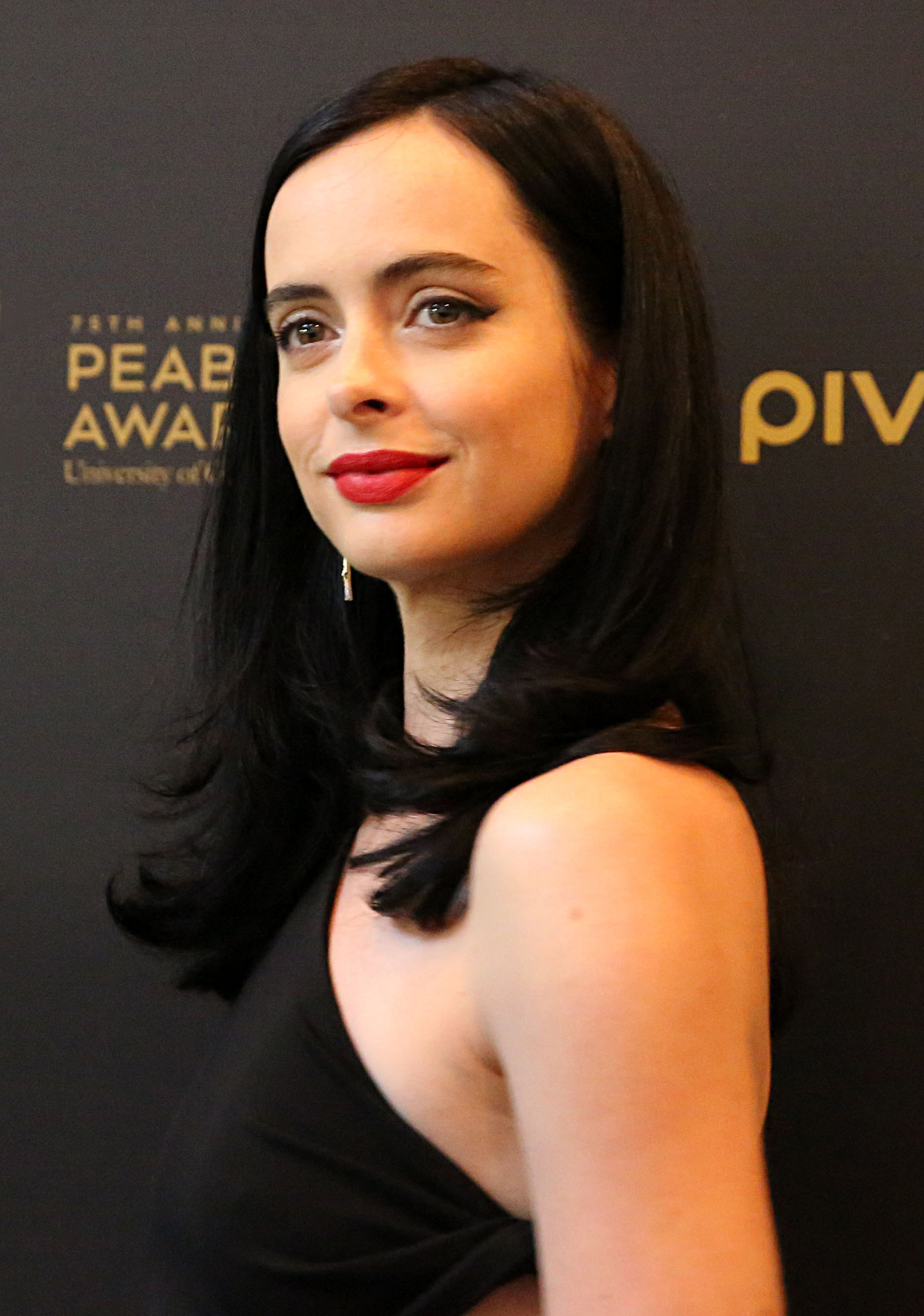
Krysten Ritter

Jane Margolis (played by Krysten Ritter) is Jesse's landlady, neighbor, and eventual girlfriend. She is a prolific drafter, a skill that she has used to become a tattoo artist despite not having any tattoos. She is also a recovering drug addict. She discovers that Jesse also has a past interest in drawing, and they become intrigued by each other. They quickly become a couple, and she relapses into drug addiction, introducing Jesse to heroin. She later phones Walt and successfully threatens to expose him if he refuses to give Jesse his share of money from a major methamphetamine deal with Gus Fring, a deal that Jesse's drug use had nearly ruined. After Walt drops off Jesse's cut of nearly half a million dollars at his duplex, she and Jesse discuss running away together to New Zealand to start new lives. They go into Jesse's bedroom and see the heroin, but instead of throwing it away as they had promised themselves earlier, they get high and fall asleep. That night, Walt returns to the apartment and finds the drugged-out couple unconscious in bed. In the process of trying to wake Jesse from his stupor, Walt accidentally turns Jane onto her back. She begins to vomit while asleep, and Walt silently stands at the bedside watching her choke and then asphyxiate to death. Series creator Vince Gilligan explained Walt's motive for allowing Jane to die during a 2013 panel discussion about Breaking Bad at the Film at Lincoln Center, stating that Walt was afraid Jane's bad influence would lead Jesse to an early death from a heroin overdose.

Jane's death leads to significant repercussions throughout the rest of the series, and is largely responsible for Jesse's downward spiral in the first half of the third season, as well as her father Donald's deep depression which affects him to the point that he fails in his duties as an air-traffic controller and causes a midair collision between a 737 and a King Air 350 ("ABQ"). In the episode "Fly", while under the influence of sleeping pills, Walt is tormented by his guilt over his inaction the night of Jane's death; he reveals to Jesse that on the same night she died, he unknowingly met her father in a bar (realizing it was him only after seeing him on the news following the plane crash), and questions the statistical improbability of that sequence of events, but stops shy of revealing his involvement. Walt finally reveals the full extent of his role in Jane's death to Jesse in the series' ante-penultimate episode, "Ozymandias", as a final blow after he ordered Jack to kill him, deeming him responsible for Hank's death and the loss of his fortune.

Jane appears in a flashback in El Camino: A Breaking Bad Movie, reciting the final lines of the film. She reminds Jesse that sometimes the universe takes people towards bad places, and despite her free-spirited nature she considers it better to make life's important decisions by yourself.

==== Badger ====
Brandon "Badger" Mayhew (played by Matt L. Jones) is Jesse's friend. Despite being on probation, Badger still uses drugs. He had a job as a street advertising mascot for an Albuquerque bank. During Season 1, Badger leaves the job to cook crystal meth with Jesse. Disagreements soon occur and they bitterly part ways. In Season 2, Badger and Jesse reconcile, and Badger helps clear the meth lab from Jesse's basement, then assists in hiding Jesse's RV, which previously contained the meth lab. Walt and Jesse later employ Badger to sell their product, but he is quickly arrested. Once released, Badger flees to California. After Badger returns to New Mexico, Jesse persuades him to start selling meth again. Badger later attends Narcotics Anonymous meetings with Skinny Pete, where they intend to find new buyers by informing a group of recovering drug addicts that "Blue Sky" (Walt and Jesse's product) is again available. Badger and Pete begin to find the meetings helpful and continue to attend regularly. Badger helps Jesse several more times, and is in attendance at Jesse's house party, which lasts several days. He is also the lead singer for TwaüghtHammër, the band in which he plays with Jesse. Badger is a science fiction fan and discusses at length his idea for a Star Trek script in the episode "Blood Money." He and Pete help Walt threaten the Schwartzes in the series finale, "Felina", by holding laser pointers to imitate the laser sights of sniper rifles. The ruse enables Walt to compel the Schwartzes to use Walt's remaining money to establish a trust for Walter Jr.

Badger and Skinny Pete appear in El Camino, helping Jesse hide for the night after he flees Jack's compound in Todd's El Camino and distracting police to give Jesse time to get away. As part of Pete's plan to aid Jesse, Pete stays at home and waits for police to respond to the El Camino's LoJack so he can tell them he traded his Thunderbird to Jesse for the El Camino. Badger drives Pete's Thunderbird several hours south of Albuquerque to make it appear that Jesse fled to Mexico. Jesse leaves Badger and Pete's house in Badger's Pontiac Fiero. After saying goodbye to Badger and Pete, Jesse continues to drive Badger's Fiero until he leaves Albuquerque with Ed to start his new life in Alaska. As later revealed by Francesca Liddy in Better Call Saul's "Breaking Bad", Skinny Pete and Badger's plan worked and the authorities later found the car by the Mexico border and as a result, they believe that Jesse has fled to Mexico.

==== Skinny Pete ====
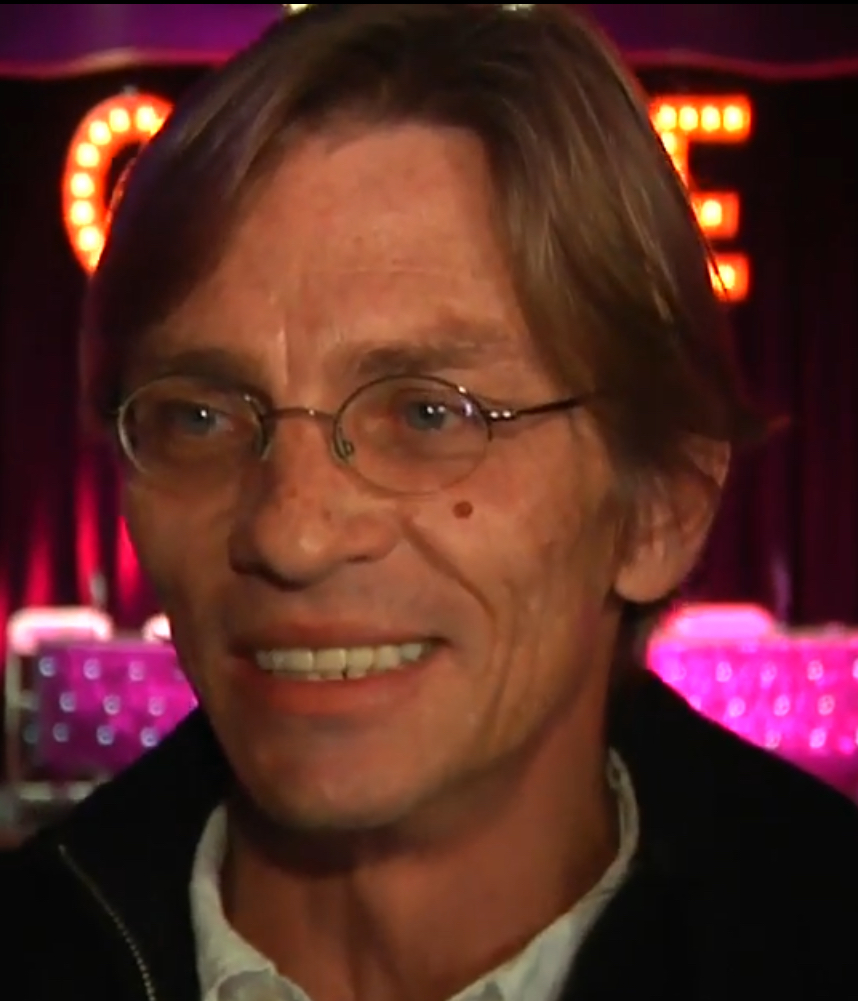
Charles Baker

Peter, commonly referred to as Skinny Pete (played by Charles Baker), is Jesse's friend. He served time in prison with Tuco and introduces Jesse to him. Jesse recruits Pete to deal meth, although Pete is on probation. When Pete is mugged by two addicts, Jesse is forced to get the money and product back. After Badger is arrested and Combo is killed, Pete quits dealing for Jesse, fearing being sent back to prison and for his own safety. He decides to sell meth for Jesse again, albeit on a smaller scale. He attends Narcotics Anonymous meetings with Badger. After following the program together and staying clean, they relapse when Jesse tempts them with meth. After a few days of heavy meth use they leave Jesse's house. In the Season 5 episode "Hazard Pay", Pete is shown to be a talented pianist as he plays a small section of C.P.E. Bach's Solfeggietto at a music store. He is also seen in the mid-season premiere "Blood Money", hanging out at Jesse's house and listening to Badger's Star Trek script.

Pete is seen briefly in the series finale, when Walt compels Gretchen and Elliot to use his remaining money to establish a trust for Walter Jr. and Badger and Pete to use laser pointers to make them believe hitmen will kill them if they do not comply. Pete and Badger also inform Walt that his trademark blue meth is still circulating, which Walt realizes means Jesse is still alive.

In El Camino, Pete and Badger give Jesse a place to sleep after he flees from Jack's compound in Todd's El Camino. The following morning, Pete devises a plan to help Jesse evade police. Badger and Pete give Jesse the money Walt paid them for their role in coercing Gretchen and Elliot. Pete stays with the El Camino and waits for police to respond to its Lojack so he can claim he obtained it by trading his Thunderbird to Jesse. Badger drives Pete's Thunderbird several hours south to make it appear Jesse fled to Mexico. Jesse departs Pete and Badger's house in Badger's Pontiac Fiero. Pete is last seen moving the El Camino to his driveway so it will be visible from the street when the police arrive. As later revealed by Francesca Liddy in Better Call Saul's "Breaking Bad", Skinny Pete and Badger's plan worked and the authorities later found the car by the Mexico border and as a result, they believe that Jesse has fled to Mexico.

Before the release of El Camino, Netflix dropped a teaser trailer showing the DEA interrogating Pete about Jesse's whereabouts. Though it was not used in the film, several critics speculated after the premiere that the scene likely occurred after Jesse left Pete and Badger's house, which would make the trailer his final chronological appearance.

==== Combo ====
Christian "Combo" Ortega (played by Rodney Rush) is Jesse's friend and a dealer of his methamphetamine. He is also revealed to have been the one who originally owned the RV that Walt and Jesse cooked meth in, which Combo had sold to Jesse for $1,400 without his family's knowledge, which provides a big clue for Hank when tracking down "Heisenberg". He once got in legal trouble as a juvenile for stealing a Baby Jesus from a Nativity display, but was helped by Kim Wexler who served as his public defender.

Combo is later killed in "Mandala" when a rival drug group corners him while he is dealing methamphetamine on "foreign turf." Combo calls his friend Skinny Pete to report two men are "mad eyeballing" him. As he hangs up the phone, a kid on a bicycle shoots him several times, killing him on the street. Combo's death drives Jesse to spiral into drug addiction. Jesse eventually learns that the kid is Tomas Cantillo, the little brother of his new girlfriend Andrea and that Combo was murdered as part of a gang initiation. Jesse subsequently seeks retribution upon the dealers for Combo's murder and the murder of Tomas, putting him at odds with Gus Fring.

==== Adam and Diane Pinkman ====
Adam Pinkman (played by Michael Bofshever) and Diane Pinkman (played by Tess Harper) are Jesse Pinkman's parents. Due to Jesse's drug abuse, they have a strained relationship with their son, kicking him out of his late aunt's house (where Jesse had been living after serving as his aunt's caretaker and friend) after discovering a makeshift meth lab in the basement, believing it to be for manufacturing speed. Adam and Diane renovate the home, preparing it for sale. Unbeknownst to them, Jesse works with Saul Goodman to reacquire the home. Claiming to represent an anonymous buyer, Saul presents an offer significantly under market value. Offended, the Pinkmans begin to leave the negotiating table. As they are leaving, Saul reveals he knows the home used to host a meth lab, which is not revealed as required in the property disclosures; he then informs them that not declaring this is an illegal act. Realizing that the home price will plummet and they may be sued, Adam and Diane Pinkman reluctantly accept Saul's offer.

On the closing date, Jesse visits his parents at the newly renovated home. When Jesse heads to the front door, Diane tells Jesse that the house has been sold, and that he needs to leave, as the new owners will be stopping by shortly. When Jesse does not stop, a confused Mrs. Pinkman asks where he is going. Jesse reveals that he is the new owner.

The Pinkmans appear in El Camino, requesting in a news interview that Jesse turn himself in. Knowing his parents are probably being monitored by the police, Jesse calls, indicates a willingness to turn himself in, and asks them to pick him up. Before hanging up, Jesse tells his parents they did their best when raising him, and the life he has led and the problems he has caused are his fault, not theirs. After his parents leave, Jesse's call is revealed to be a ruse to draw them and police away from the house. Jesse enters unobserved and recovers two handguns from his parents' safe, a Colt Woodsman and an Iver Johnson Hammerless.

==== Jake Pinkman ====
Jacob Pinkman (played by Ben Petry) is Jesse's younger, over-achieving brother. Jesse accepts the blame for a joint belonging to Jake, which results in Jesse being thrown out of his parents' house. After apologizing to his brother, Jake asks for his joint back; Jesse responds by crushing it on the sidewalk and informing his brother that the marijuana is of poor quality anyway.

In El Camino, when Jesse calls his parents he asks about Jake, and they tell Jesse that Jake is attending a band camp in London, implying that they are yet to find out about his addiction. When Jesse attempts to open his parents' safe, he correctly guesses that the combination corresponds to Jake's birthday.

==== Wendy ====
Wendy (portrayed by Julia Minesci) is a meth-addicted street prostitute, who associates with Jesse Pinkman and is featured in the online promotional material as one of Saul Goodman's clients (as "Wendy S."). In Better Call Saul ("Hit and Run"), Jimmy and Kim hire her to help run a con against Howard Hamlin. Wendy alerts Kim to a car following them, which Wendy believes to be undercover police; Kim later discovers that she and Jimmy are being monitored as part of Mike and Gus's manhunt for Lalo Salamanca.

In Breaking Bad Wendy helps Jesse maintain an alibi and withstands an intense interrogation from Hank Schrader on Jesse's behalf. Recognizing her loyalty to him, Jesse tries to convince her to help him kill two drug dealers who convinced Tomás to murder Combo on Gus's orders. She declines at first, fearing the repercussions, revealing that she has a son whom she needs to protect, but Jesse persuades her to help by drawing a comparison between Tomás and her own son. At the last moment, she is spared the ordeal by Mike, who intervenes to take Jesse to a meeting with the drug dealers.

In the cold open of "Half Measures" which focuses on Wendy, the song "Windy" by The Association plays in the background, which is a pun on her name.

=== Associates of Saul Goodman ===
==== Marco Pasternak ====
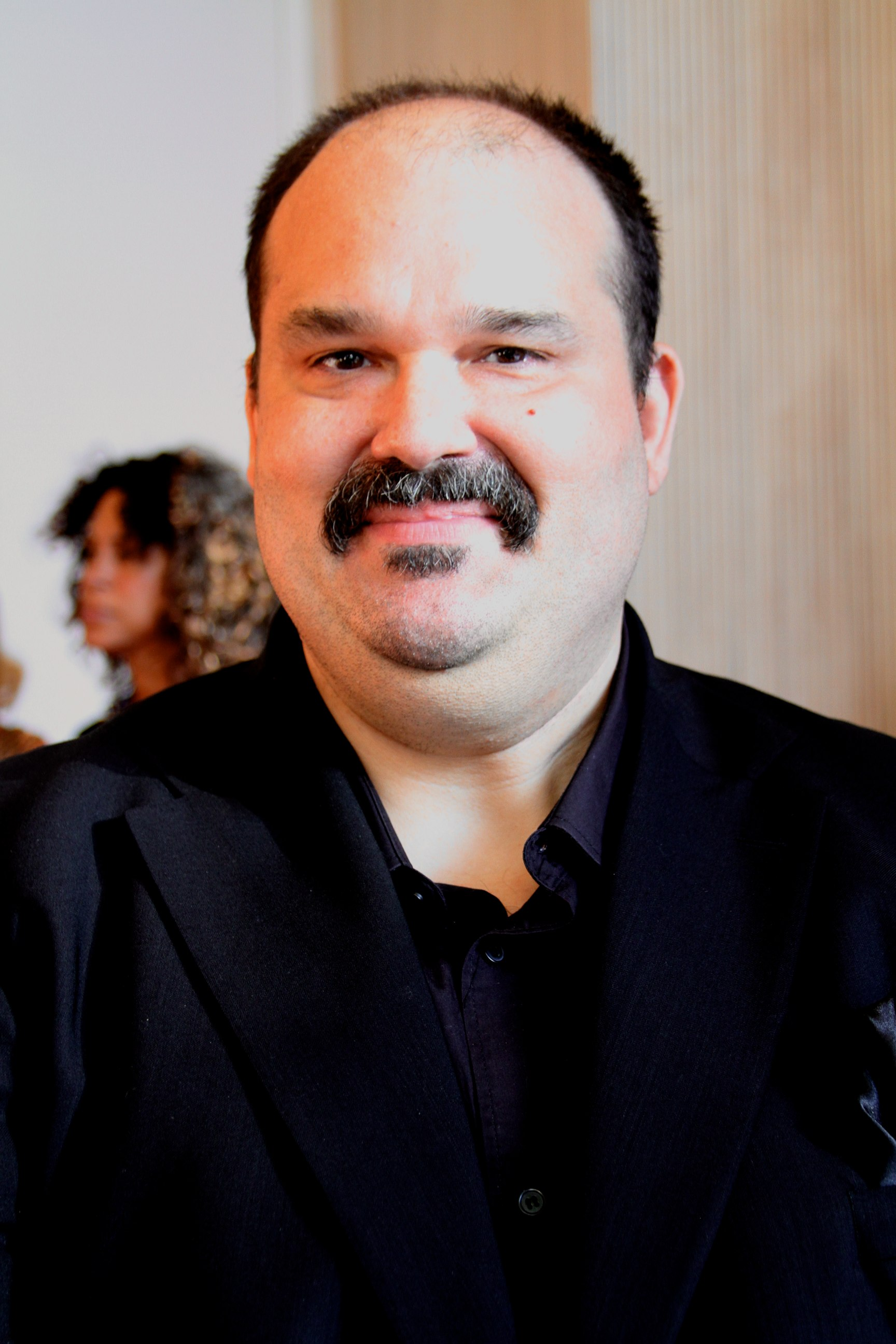
Mel Rodriguez

Marco Pasternak (portrayed by Mel Rodriguez) is a scam artist and one of Jimmy McGill's lifelong friends. A high school classmate of Jimmy's in Cicero, Illinois, they frequently worked cons together, including the "fake Rolex". After Chuck helps secure Jimmy's release following his arrest for the "Chicago sunroof" incident, Chuck requires Jimmy to move to Albuquerque and work a legitimate job. Jimmy stops by his and Marco's favorite bar to say goodbye, leaving Marco disappointed.

After suffering a breakdown because of Chuck's attempts to prevent him from rising in the legal profession, Jimmy returns to Cicero and reunites with Marco, who now works for his brother-in-law as a standpipe installer. After a week of running successful scams, Jimmy informs Marco he is an attorney and needs to return to Albuquerque. Marco begs Jimmy to pull one more scam before he goes, and Jimmy agrees. While running the "fake Rolex" con, Marco suffers a fatal heart attack. Before he dies, he tells Jimmy that the week they spent together was the best of his life. Jimmy inherits Marco's pinky ring, which is too big for him. Despite the poor fit, Jimmy begins to wear Marco's ring as a symbol of his newfound willingness to cut corners to get ahead in the legal profession.

==== Ernesto ====
Ernesto (portrayed by Brandon K. Hampton) is an employee of HHM and a friend of Jimmy McGill and Kim Wexler. After Chuck McGill told Jimmy that he disapproved of his legal career and did not view him as a peer, Jimmy asked Howard to ensure Chuck continued to be looked after, including bringing him groceries and newspapers. Howard assigned Chuck's daily care to Ernesto.

After Chuck suspects Jimmy of altering Mesa Verde documents to regain the bank as a client for Kim, he enlists Ernesto to investigate, and Ernesto eventually finds the all-night copy store where Jimmy carried out the alterations. Ernesto brings Chuck to the store to interview the clerk but Chuck's EHS symptoms cause him to faint and hit his head on a counter. Jimmy was hiding nearby after bribing the clerk to deny having seen him on his earlier visit, and enters the store to provide first aid to Chuck. At the hospital, Chuck wonders how Jimmy happened on the scene so quickly. Ernesto covers for Jimmy by claiming that out of concern for Chuck's health, he called Jimmy after identifying the store but before bringing Chuck to the location.

As part of his plot to get Jimmy disbarred, Chuck manipulates Ernesto into hearing part of Jimmy's recorded confession to altering the Mesa Verde documents, assuming that even though Chuck has sworn him to silence, Ernesto’s loyalty and friendship will compel him to inform Kim and Jimmy. Ernesto informs Kim, who in turn informs Jimmy. After Jimmy angrily breaks into Chuck's house to destroy the tape and is witnessed by Howard and a private investigator, which enables Chuck to have Jimmy prosecuted, HHM coldly fires Ernesto for disclosing confidential information even though their scheme could not have succeeded without Ernesto having done the specific thing Chuck manipulated Ernesto into doing.

==== Francesca Liddy ====
Francesca Liddy (played by Tina Parker) is Saul Goodman's outspoken receptionist and secretary. Originally employed at the New Mexico Motor Vehicle Division, Jimmy hired her for the Wexler-McGill law firm. After Kim's car accident, Jimmy and Kim closed their office, and Francesca returned to the MVD. When Jimmy started practicing as Saul Goodman, Francesca returned to work for him.

In "Quite a Ride", a flashforward to 2010 shows Saul and Francesca frantically clearing out his office. She agrees to be at a telephone booth on November 12 (Jimmy's birthday) at 3 p.m. to receive a call. He gives her money and an attorney's business card and tells her that if she needs help she should say "Jimmy" sent her. As she leaves, Saul claims the last few years have been "quite a ride", then calls Ed Galbraith for a new identity.

In the Better Call Saul episode "Breaking Bad", in a flashforward, Francesca is now an apartment building manager and she answers the prearranged phone call which proves to be from Saul himself. After getting paid via money that Saul had left behind for her, Francesca reveals that the DEA had found and seized all of Saul's hidden assets. With Walt dead and Jesse Pinkman having supposedly fled the country, Saul is now their sole target. At Saul's request, Francesca tells him about what became of Skyler White and Huell Babineaux before revealing that Kim had called her asking after Saul.

==== Huell Babineaux ====
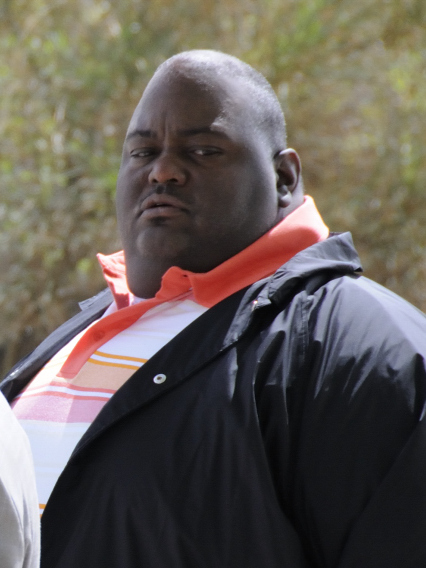
Lavell Crawford

Huell Babineaux (/ˈhjuːl ˈbæbɪnoʊ/ played by Lavell Crawford) is Saul Goodman's bodyguard, who also executes various intimidation tactics and performs other errands. Hired more for his size, strength, and pickpocketing skills than his intelligence, he has a condition approximating narcolepsy (e.g., he falls asleep at odd times, such as when standing up or while on security detail), and has digestive problems that keep him from being as stoic as Saul would like. During the bar association hearing considering Jimmy McGill's disbarment over his break in at Chuck's house, he hires Huell to plant a cell phone battery in his brother Chuck's pocket as part of a strategy to discredit Chuck's claimed electromagnetic hypersensitivity, as Chuck believes he suffers from EHS. Jimmy later hires Huell to serve as a bodyguard while Jimmy conducts his business re-selling pre-paid cellular phones. Huell is arrested after he inadvertently assaults a police officer while protecting Jimmy, and faces up to two and a half years in prison as a result. Jimmy's law license is still suspended, so he brings in Kim Wexler to defend Huell. Huell plans to flee rather than go to prison, so Kim and Jimmy forge dozens of letters describing Huell as a hero and denouncing his arrest. The con forces the prosecutor to accept a plea bargain that ensures Huell does not go to prison. As part of their plot against Howard Hamlin, Jimmy and Kim enlist Huell's help to make a copy of Howard's car keys with the help of one of Huell's associates. After successfully making the keys, Huell questions why Jimmy and Kim are bothering with such illegal activity when they have legitimate jobs as great lawyers.

In Breaking Bad, when Ted Beneke goes on a spending spree with the money Skyler arranged to give him, rather than paying his IRS debt as she intended, Huell and Kuby intimidate him into paying the IRS. Though they did not intend violence, Ted attempts to flee, falls, and suffers head and neck injuries that leave him paraplegic. In "Buried", Saul sends Huell and Kuby to collect Walt's money from a storage locker, and in "Confessions", Saul tasks Huell with pickpocketing Jesse's marijuana so Jesse will not be high when he contacts Ed the "disappearer" for a new identity. It is while Jesse is waiting for Ed that he realizes his marijuana is gone and understands that Huell had earlier pickpocketed from him the ricin cigarette that Walt had intended for Jesse to use in killing Gus. Jesse's realization that Huell stole the ricin cigarette enables him to understand that Walt must have poisoned Brock in order to turn Jesse against Gus (which is true, although Walt did not use ricin).

Hank and Gomez later interrogate Huell to learn where Walt hid his money, telling him falsely that Walt intends to kill him to ensure that no one can trace Walt's drug-dealing past. They use a staged photo of Jesse, who appears to have been killed with a gunshot to the head, to coax Huell into revealing that he and Kuby packed Walt's money into seven barrels, then loaded the barrels into a rented van. Huell also reveals that the van was so dirty on the outside when Walt returned that they washed it before returning it, implying that Walt's money was buried somewhere in the desert. Hank and Gomez tell Huell to wait until they come back for him, but they are killed and never return.

Six years after Huell's final appearance on Breaking Bad, and three days before the release of El Camino: A Breaking Bad Movie, a countdown was shared on Breaking Bad's social media channels. Throughout the countdown, multiple videos were shown of Huell still sitting impatiently in the safehouse where Hank and Gomez left him, watching the events of "Felina" on the news. Upon the countdown's conclusion, Huell, now tired of waiting, says "screw this", puts on his jacket and leaves the safehouse as the title credits of El Camino appear on his television.

In the Better Call Saul episode "Breaking Bad", Francesca tells Saul that Huell is back home in New Orleans now. As the DEA had taken him in under false pretenses, they were forced to let him go in the end.

==== Patrick Kuby ====
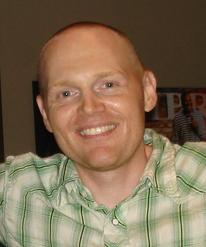
Bill Burr

Patrick Kuby (played by Bill Burr) is one of Saul Goodman's hired hands. He assists in facilitating the car wash sale to the Whites by impersonating an environmental inspector, and later intimidates Ted Beneke with Huell's help. He also aids Walt, Jesse, and Mike in their train robbery and helps Huell collect Walt's money from storage. Before moving to Albuquerque, Kuby was involved in organized crime in Boston.

==== Ed Galbraith ====
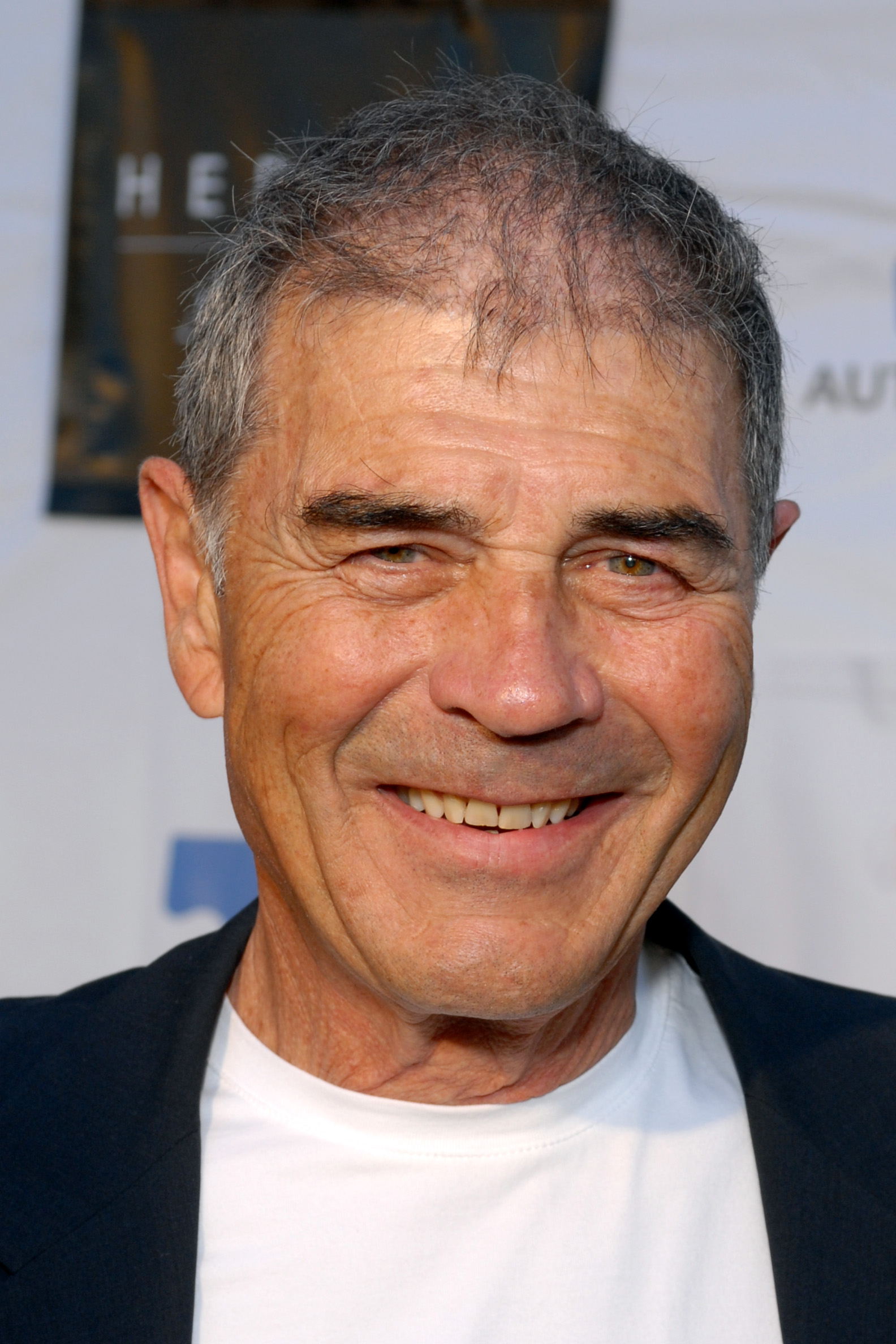
Robert Forster

Ed Galbraith (played by Robert Forster), also known as "the Disappearer", specializes in providing fugitives with new identities and new places to live. He operates a legitimate vacuum sales and service center, Best Quality Vacuum, as a front for this criminal business.

Though mentioned in earlier episodes (such as in "Crawl Space"), Ed first appears in "Granite State". As Walter is identified as Heisenberg and becomes the target of a manhunt, both Walt and Saul seek Ed's criminal services. Ed first helps Saul escape to Omaha, Nebraska. He later takes Walter White to New Hampshire, hiding him away in a cabin in a rural area. During Walt's time in hiding, Ed often visits Walt, bringing him supplies and administering chemotherapy, though he warns that if Walt leaves the location, their business relationship will be over for good. A lonely Walt also takes to paying Ed to spend time with him and play cards.

In El Camino, Jesse approaches Ed for relocation. Ed demands $125,000 to aid Jesse, plus $125,000 for the previous occasion Jesse was supposed to use his services, but failed to appear. Jesse is $1,800 short and Ed refuses to help. After Jesse obtains the money, Ed smuggles him to a car parked near Haines, Alaska and provides him with false identification and a cover story. Jesse gives Ed a farewell letter for Brock Cantillo, which Ed promises to mail from Mexico City in the near future, wishing Jesse luck on his new life and noting that not many people like them get a fresh start.

In Better Call Saul, in the flashforward at the beginning of season 5's "Magic Man", (set after the events of El Camino) Saul (in his new identity as Gene Takavic) calls Ed for a second extraction after a cab driver named Jeff recognizes him. Ed recognizes Saul's voice and agrees to a second extraction, warning that it will cost double. Saul agrees and Ed schedules the extraction and location, but after a moment of consideration, Saul changes his mind and tells Ed that he will "fix it [himself]" instead.

In Better Call Saul season 6's "Axe and Grind", Saul and Kim Wexler look at Dr. Caldera's little black book of criminal contacts, which are all coded. However, amongst the pages are several Best Quality Vacuum business cards, revealing that Caldera has connections to Ed and also possibly explaining how Saul ultimately first becomes aware of Ed and his services. Kim looks at one of the cards with confusion and interest for a moment before putting it away again. In the series finale, "Saul Gone", Saul attempts to call Ed for another extraction after his cover is finally blown, but Saul is captured by the police before he can make the call.

Robert Forster's appearances as Ed in El Camino and Better Call Saul were among his final roles. He died of brain cancer on October 11, 2019, the same day the movie was released, though he appeared in Better Call Saul as Ed posthumously. Ed is one of the only five characters to appear in Breaking Bad, Better Call Saul, and El Camino, along with Mike Ehrmantraut, Walter White, Jesse Pinkman, and Austin Ramey. The Better Call Saul episode "Magic Man" was dedicated to Forster.

==== Joey Dixon ====
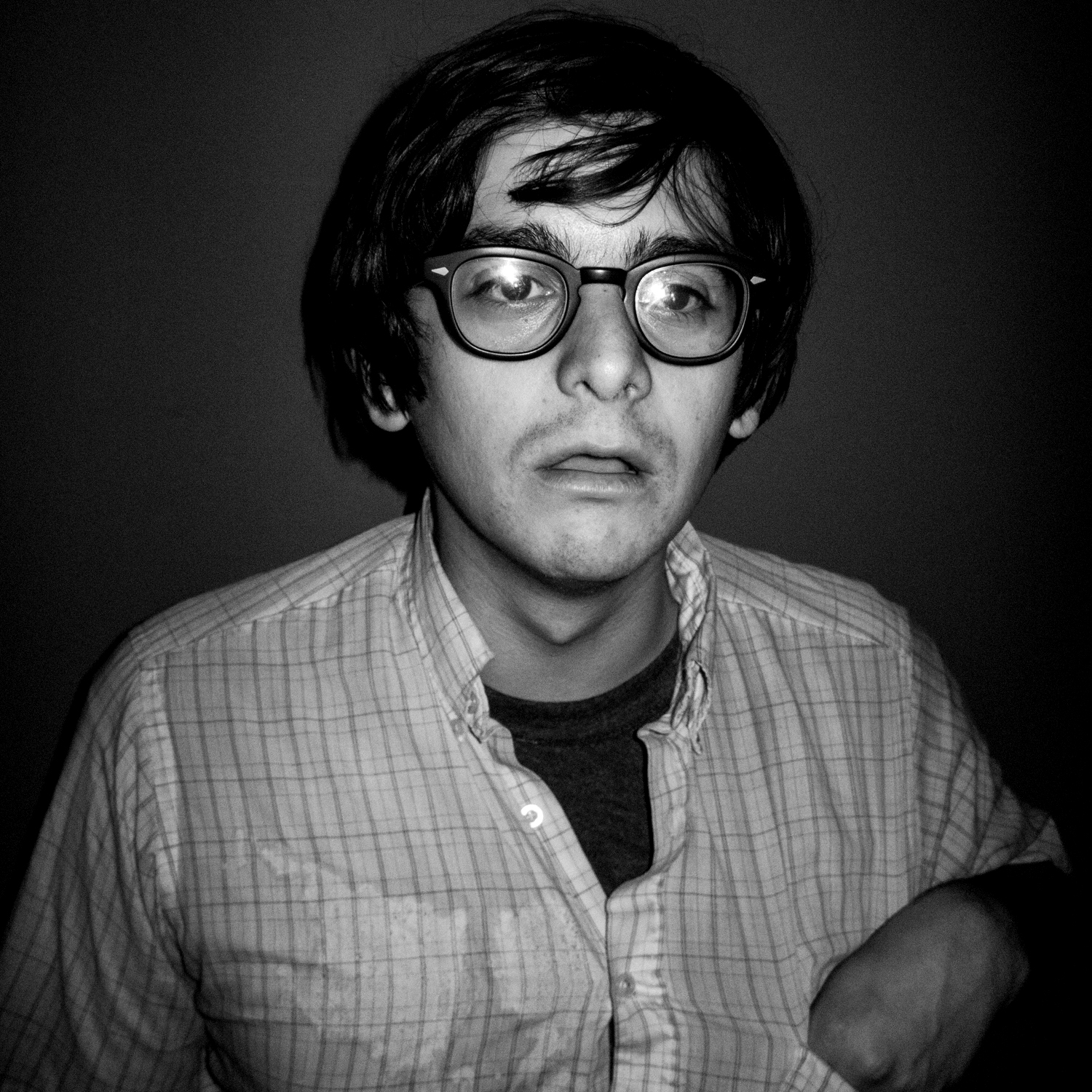
Josh Fadem

Marshall Joseph "Joey" Dixon (played by Josh Fadem), aka Camera Guy, is the cameraman of the college filmmaking crew Jimmy McGill occasionally uses to shoot TV ads and other events. Jimmy originally referred to him only as Camera Guy. Jimmy also initially refers to the other crew members only by the functions they perform. After graduating, Joey is shown guest lecturing at the college and working in its audiovisual equipment center. He, Phil, and Cheri would go on to create the "Filmmaker Training" series of videos of informational tips and tricks for filmmaking, in which Kim also made an appearance.

==== Phil ====
Phil (played by Julian Bonfiglio), also known as Sound Guy, handles the microphones and audio for the college filmmaking crew Jimmy sometimes hires.

==== Cheri ====
Cheri (played by Hayley Holmes), also known as Drama Girl or Make-Up Girl, assists Joey's film crew and also arranges hair and make-up for individuals preparing to appear on camera. First referred to as Make-Up Girl, she later indicates she has been attending acting classes. After she impersonates several individuals on the phone to provide testimonials for Huell in "Coushatta", Jimmy begins referring to her as Drama Girl. In "Winner", Jimmy and Kim fake several events designed to show Jimmy's remorse over Chuck's death, hoping this will lead to reinstatement of his law license. During a catered celebration to mark the dedication of a law library in Chuck's name, Cheri works as a waitress and aids Jimmy and Kim's deception by spreading the story among guests that Jimmy anonymously financed the project. When Jimmy and Kim need to re-shoot their photos of the actor pretending to be the Sandpiper case mediator, Cheri arrives on short notice to work on his hair and make-up. Because she has been pulled from a dress rehearsal for a stage adaptation of The Dark Crystal, she arrives in her Kira character's make-up and costume.

==== Irene Landry ====
Irene Landry (played by Jean Effron) is an elderly client of Jimmy and resident of Sandpiper Crossing. When she tells Jimmy she cannot afford a will he proposes and can pay him after receiving her allowance from Sandpiper, it leads to Jimmy discovering that the nursing home has been overcharging its residents. Irene later becomes the class representative of the Sandpiper Crossing class-action lawsuit. When she waits to accept a settlement offer proposed by Erin Brill on the advice of her lawyers as they could obtain a bigger settlement, Jimmy turns her friends against her in an attempt to manipulate her into accepting the offer immediately, but out of regret helps Irene regain her friends by discrediting himself. Irene eventually accepts the original offer, however, after Jimmy and Kim sabotage Howard and force a settlement.

==== Ira ====
Ira (played by Franc Ross) is a professional burglar and the owner of Vamonos Pest, a pest control company which fronts for his burglaries and later Walter White's meth business. In Better Call Saul, Ira works as a vending machine beverage distributor and can be contacted through Dr. Caldera. He is hired by Jimmy to steal a valuable Hummel figurine from Neff Copiers, which he replaces with a similar one. After splitting the proceeds from the sale of the figurine with Jimmy, Ira reveals he uses a new phone for every job, which gives Jimmy the idea to start a business of selling prepaid mobile phones to street criminals.

==== Clarence ====
Clarence (played by David Mattey), nicknamed "Man Mountain", is an Albuquerque hoodlum who hires himself out for illegal "muscle" work through Dr. Caldera. Alongside Mike and Sobchak, he is hired as one of Pryce's bodyguards for a deal with Nacho, but flees after seeing Mike disarm Sobchak. Man Mountain later assists Jimmy (along with Huell) in intimidating three juvenile delinquents who mugged him when he was selling burner phones and sells churros to Jimmy's criminal clients during an event to publicize his reinstated legal services.

Man Mountain also appears in El Camino, in which he now works as a bouncer and brings three prostitutes to Neil Kandy and his friends for their party. He sleeps in his car while the others celebrate. In the film, his real name is revealed to be Clarence. He is one of only two characters (alongside Suzanne Ericsen) to appear in Better Call Saul and El Camino but not Breaking Bad.

==== Lance ====
Lance (played by Elisha Yaffe) is a cashier at the copy shop where Jimmy doctors Chuck's Mesa Verde documents. Jimmy bribes Lance to lie for him when Ernesto brings Chuck to the store to question him.

==== Genidowski ====
Genidowski (played by Lennie Loftin) is a con man hired by Jimmy and Kim to pose as Howard's private investigator. He gives Howard photos that appear to show Jimmy bribing the judge Rand Casimiro, then secretly switches them with innocuous photos of Jimmy that Julie brings to Howard during the Sandpiper mediation session. When Howard tries to call him again, he discovers that Genidowski is a fraud.

==== Lenny ====
Lenny (played by John Ennis) is a grocery store employee and amateur actor hired by Jimmy and Kim to impersonate the judge Rand Casimiro in still photos, as part of their ploy to discredit Howard Hamlin and force a settlement on the Sandpiper Crossing class-action lawsuit.

==== Jeff ====
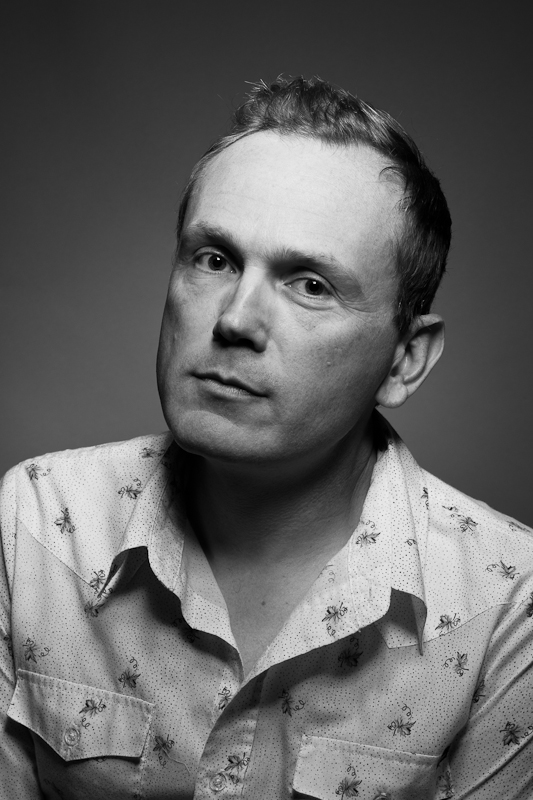
Pat Healy

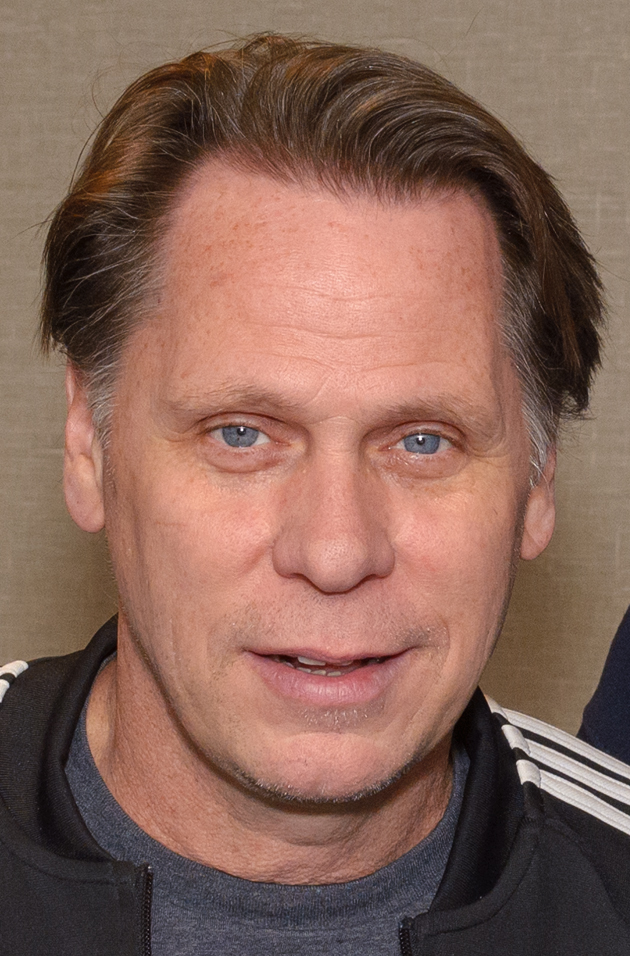
Don Harvey

Jeff (portrayed by Don Harvey in seasons 4–5 and Pat Healy in season 6) is an eccentric cab driver from Albuquerque who recognizes Jimmy under his Gene Takavic identity in Omaha. Jeff approaches Jimmy on his lunchbreak with his friend Buddy and asks Jimmy to do his iconic "Better Call Saul!" catchphrase and point. Although initially hesitant Jimmy gives in and Jeff tells him to ask for him whenever he needs a ride.

Jimmy finds and befriends Jeff's mother, Marion, and she invites him back to her house. While there Jeff confronts Jimmy, and Jimmy offers to get him into "the game". Jeff, Jimmy, and Buddy plan a robbery at the mall where Jimmy works. Jimmy creates a floor plan of the store they will be robbing and recreates it in an open field for Jeff to practice his route. When the day of the robbery arrives, Jimmy distracts the security guard while Jeff robs the store. All is going well until Jeff slips and knocks himself out, forcing Jimmy to fake a depressive episode until he can regain consciousness. Eventually, Jeff wakes up and completes the robbery. Afterward as the three of them are celebrating, Jimmy reveals that he purposely set up the robbery in such a way that if Jeff tries to snitch on his true identity they will both be arrested. As he leaves, Marion tells Jimmy that she thinks he is a good influence on Jeff.

Jimmy later resumes working with Jeff and his friend Buddy in a new series of scams involving identity theft. Buddy backs out when he learns their latest target has cancer; Gene cuts him out of the operation and forces Jeff to drive him to the man's house so that he can break in himself. While Gene is inside, Jeff panics when he sees a police car idling behind him and crashes his taxi into a parked vehicle, leading to his arrest. In addition, the homeowner came out and accused Jeff of robbing him, adding to his legal troubles. Gene promises to bail out Jeff and calls Marion asking her to accompany him, but Marion becomes suspicious and uses the laptop Jeff bought her with the department store money to discover Gene's true identity as Saul Goodman. When Gene is arrested, no mention is made of his crimes from Omaha so it's unclear what happened to Jeff afterwards, but Gene had told Jeff that there was no proof of Jeff having committed the robbery and he could likely get those charges dismissed.

==== Buddy ====
Buddy (portrayed by Max Bickelhaup) is a friend of Jeff who accompanies him to the mall when Jeff approaches Jimmy under his "Gene Takavic" alias and has him admit his true identity. Jimmy later offers to get Jeff into "the game" by training him and Buddy in robbing a department store at the mall where Jimmy works. Buddy sneaks Jeff into the mall by having him lay in a shipping container and transporting it into the department store's loading dock. Jimmy convinces the store's supervisor over the phone to hold the container overnight, allowing Jeff to enter the store during after-hours and steal expensive merchandise. After the robbery is complete, Jimmy warns Jeff and Buddy to stay away from him lest he report the crime to the authorities.

Jimmy later re-enlists Jeff and Buddy in a new series of cons where Jimmy befriends wealthy single men at bars and gets them drunk, Jeff drives them home while giving them water laced with barbiturates, and Buddy breaks into the marks' homes while they are unconscious and photographs their IDs and financial records, which Jeff later sells to a broker. However, Buddy backs out of the con when their latest target is found to have pancreatic cancer, which Buddy's father suffered from. Jimmy cuts Buddy out of the operation and forces Jeff to drive him to the target's house so he can break in himself.

=== New Mexico legal community ===
==== Bill Oakley ====
William Oakley (portrayed by Peter Diseth) is a deputy district attorney who has a friendly rivalry with Jimmy. When Jimmy goes to work as an associate at Davis & Main, Oakley expresses envy at his salary and fringe benefits. When Jimmy is arrested for the break in at Chuck's, Oakley first appears to gloat at Jimmy's booking, but then offers to expedite the proceedings by getting Jimmy's first court appearance moved up on the docket. After Jimmy's law license is reinstated, he employs his camera crew to stage a phony news interview with a surprised Oakley, generating publicity for Jimmy's new Saul Goodman persona. After Jimmy becomes a pariah at the courthouse, Oakley tells him it is because word of his representation of the Salamancas has become widespread. In the flashforwards in the episode "Breaking Bad", Bill is revealed to have eventually left the DA's office and become a defense attorney with an advertisement for Bill's services replacing Saul's former ad on a park bench. In the series finale "Saul Gone", Saul hires Bill as his defense attorney after getting caught.

==== Rich Schweikart ====
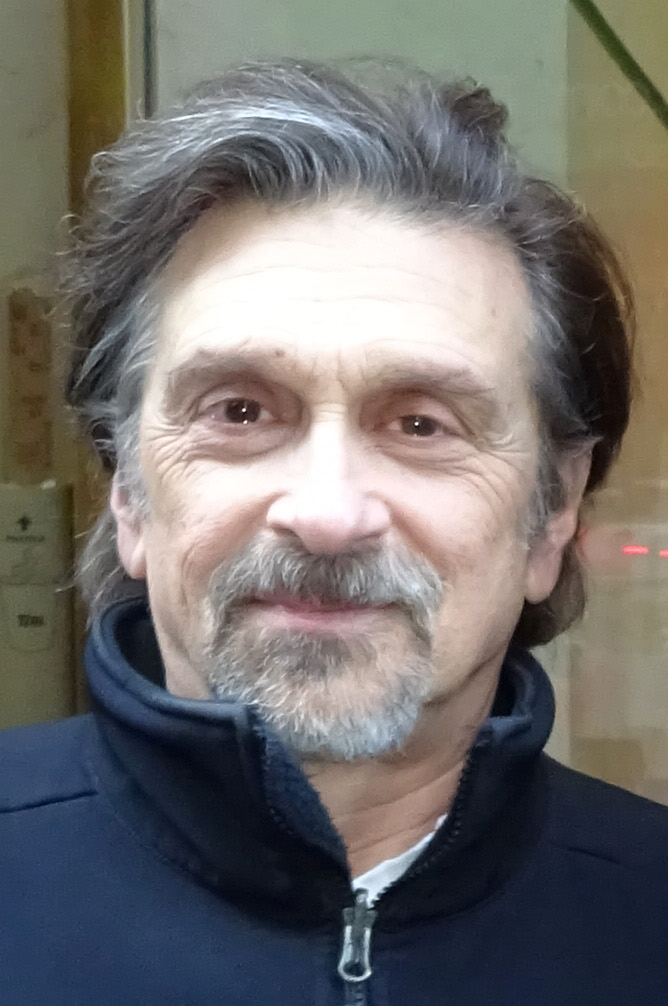
Dennis Boutsikaris

Richard Schweikart (played by Dennis Boutsikaris) is the co-founder of the Schweikart & Cokely (S&C) law firm. Rich is the lead attorney for the Sandpiper retirement homes in HHM's lawsuit against the company. He observes that Kim Wexler is both highly skilled and underappreciated at HHM, and offers her a job at S&C, which she declines. Kim later starts a solo practice with Mesa Verde Bank as her only client, but begins to spend more time and effort on pro bono criminal defense cases that she finds more appealing than banking law. She approaches Rich about joining S&C, and becomes a partner in charge of the firm's new banking division, including the Mesa Verde account. Kim devotes increasing time and effort to her pro bono cases, which eventually causes her to quit S&C and her representation of Mesa Verde. When Jimmy and Kim's tricks lead to Howard's erratic behavior at a mediation session for the Sandpiper case, Rich succeeds at compelling Hamlin, Hamlin & McGill and Davis & Main to accept a lower settlement than what they wanted. After Howard's death, Rich attends his funeral at HHM, expressing his admiration and respect for Howard and revealing to Jimmy and Kim that HHM is downsizing, moving to a smaller office, and changing the firm's name.

==== Cliff Main ====
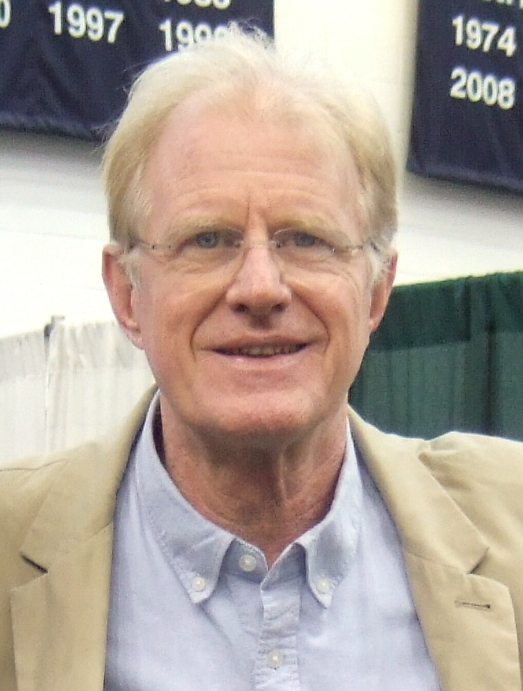
Ed Begley Jr.

Clifford Main (played by Ed Begley Jr.) is a senior partner at the Davis & Main law firm in Santa Fe. When the Sandpiper case becomes too big for HHM alone, they affiliate with D&M. Kim recommends Jimmy to Cliff, and D&M hires Jimmy as an associate. Jimmy's unauthorized airing of a television ad soliciting clients for the Sandpiper lawsuit angers Cliff and the firm's partners. The ensuing scrutiny of his work motivates Jimmy to quit, but the possibility of losing his signing bonus leads him to instead cause trouble around the workplace and antagonize his colleagues. Cliff eventually fires him and says letting Jimmy keep the bonus is worth it to be rid of him. When Jimmy and Kim decide to obtain Jimmy's share of the settlement or judgment sooner by forcing a resolution of the Sandpiper case, they take advantage of Cliff's friendship with Howard to smear Howard's reputation. In the process, Kim impresses Cliff who offers to use his connections to help her build a legitimate pro bono law firm. Initially receptive, Kim ultimately prioritizes the plan to ruin Howard. Kim and Jimmy convince Cliff and the counsel for Sandpiper that Howard is an unstable cocaine addict, so Cliff cuts ties with Howard and settles the Sandpiper case himself. Following Howard's unexpected murder, Cliff and the New Mexico legal community are fooled into believing it was a suicide. Cliff comforts Cheryl, Howard's widow, at the memorial service. Kim lies to Cheryl about the addiction and Cliff regretfully informs her of Howard's erratic behavior, which convinces Cheryl of the con.

==== Erin Brill ====
Erin Brill (portrayed by Jessie Ennis) is a second-year associate at Davis & Main. She is assigned to supervise Jimmy after he runs afoul of his D&M bosses, which serves as one of the motivations for him to quit. When Irene, the class representative in the lawsuit against Sandpiper Crossing, turns down a proposed resolution because the lawyers convince her waiting will result in a bigger settlement, her friends turn against her. Jimmy wants his share of the judgment sooner, so he tricks her into accepting, but her friends remain distrustful. Jimmy then arranges for Irene and her friends to overhear him confessing his tricks to Erin, which prevents the case from being resolved immediately but restores Irene's friendships. As the case continues, a meeting of residents at Sandpiper's Albuquerque facility reveals they are considering accepting the company's offer. Erin's attempt to mollify them begins to go off track, but Howard's timely intervention causes them to agree to continue holding out for a bigger settlement. Erin manages the conference call during the Sandpiper mediation conference and is the first to notice that Howard's eyes have dilated from contact with the drug Jimmy and Kim procured from Dr. Caldera. After the case is settled, Erin announces the resolution to the conference call participants.

==== Omar ====
Omar (portrayed by Omar Maskati) is an employee at Davis & Main who befriends Jimmy during his brief stint at the firm. He shows Jimmy an old television commercial by D&M, which inspires Jimmy to make his own, and also helps Jimmy with writing his resignation letter. After Jimmy quits D&M, Omar helps him move his cocobolo desk to his old office.

==== Brian Archuleta ====
Brian Archuleta (portrayed by Luis Bordonada) is an employee at Davis & Main and a minor participant in the Sandpiper case. Jimmy targets him and Doug Lynton in one of his attempts to get fired, by staining their suits with his smoothie. Brian later attends Chuck's funeral.

==== Doug Lynton ====
Doug Lynton (portrayed by David Grant Wright) is a partner at Davis & Main. He scolds Jimmy for airing his Sandpiper commercial without D&M's consent and wants to fire him, but Cliff gives Jimmy a second chance. Jimmy later targets him and Brian Archuleta in one of his attempts to get fired, by staining their suits with his smoothie.

==== Cordova ====
Cordova (portrayed by Lucinda Marker) is a partner at Davis & Main. She scolds Jimmy for airing his Sandpiper commercial without D&M's consent and wants to fire him, but Cliff gives Jimmy a second chance.

==== Paige Novick ====
Paige Novick (portrayed by Cara Pifko) is the senior counsel of Mesa Verde. When Kim is relegated to menial document review work at Hamlin, Hamlin & McGill, she works her professional, personal, and law school contacts in hopes that landing a major new client will help get her back in Howard's good graces. Paige and Kim were law school classmates, which leads to Paige and Mesa Verde CEO Kevin Wachtell bringing the bank's business to HHM. When Kim leaves HHM, Kevin and Paige agree that Mesa Verde will be a client of her new firm, but Chuck succeeds at winning them back to HHM. Jimmy's sabotage of Chuck's Mesa Verde work causes Kevin and Paige to return to Kim. After Jimmy and Kim humiliate Chuck at Jimmy's bar disciplinary hearing in order to prevent Jimmy's disbarment, Paige gloats over Chuck's demise, which causes Kim to feel guilty and visibly angers her. As Kim becomes disillusioned with Mesa Verde's tactics, she and Paige are sometimes at odds. After Kim surrenders her law license, she mentions that Paige has agreed to take on her clients.

==== Suzanne Ericsen ====
Suzanne Ericsen (portrayed by Julie Pearl) is a deputy district attorney. When Huell is arrested, Suzanne refuses to negotiate, so Jimmy and Kim trick her into agreeing to a plea bargain. When Jimmy, now practicing law as Saul Goodman, attempts to negotiate several plea deals at once, Suzanne refuses, so he arranges a situation that enables him to trick her into accepting. Suzanne and the detective investigating the murder Lalo committed under an alias later connect Jimmy to Lalo and Nacho, and Suzanne asks Kim to persuade Jimmy to inform on the Salamancas. In El Camino, Suzanne is visible on a television screen as she stands behind SAC Austin Ramey while Ramey briefs reporters about the events that took place at Jack's compound. In "Saul Gone", she calls Kim to inform her of Saul's arrest and says he is going to give testimony that impacts Kim. She is one of only two characters (alongside Clarence) to appear in Better Call Saul and El Camino but not Breaking Bad.

==== Kyra Hay ====
Kyra Hay (portrayed by Kimberly Hébert Gregory) is a deputy district attorney from Belen, New Mexico. After Jimmy is arrested for breaking into Chuck's house to destroy a tape of his confession to falsifying the Mesa Verde documents, she is appointed by Bill Oakley to prosecute Jimmy in court. At Chuck's suggestion, Hay offers Jimmy a pre-prosecution diversion (PPD) that would require him to confess his crimes to the state bar association in exchange for avoiding prison time. During a meeting between Jimmy, Kim, Chuck and Howard to finalize Jimmy's confession, she insists Jimmy to apologize to Chuck for his actions.

==== Viola Goto ====
Viola Goto (portrayed by Keiko Agena) is a paralegal who works for Kim Wexler. When Kim leaves Hamlin Hamlin & McGill to begin a solo practice, Mesa Verde Bank retains her as their outside counsel and Kim hires Viola to assist her. When Kim becomes bored with banking law and begins to accept pro bono criminal defense cases, she hands off more and more of her Mesa Verde work to Viola. Kim later convinces Schweikart & Cokely (S&C) to hire her as a partner in charge of their new banking division, with Mesa Verde as their major banking client, and Viola follows Kim to S&C. When Kim aids Jimmy to defend Huell Babineaux during Jimmy's law license suspension, Viola assists Kim in researching the relevant statutes so Jimmy and Kim can plan their defense. After Kim asks Jimmy to represent Everett Acker to prevent Acker from being evicted by Mesa Verde, Viola provides Kim frequent updates about Jimmy's machinations. Viola is present at the meeting between Kim, Kevin Wachtell, Paige Novick, Rich Schweikart and Jimmy (as Saul Goodman) when Jimmy shocks everyone by making exorbitant demands of Kevin, then pressuring Kevin to agree to a better deal for Acker than what Kevin had previously been willing to accept. When Kim leaves S&C, Viola continues to work there as a paralegal. After Jimmy and Kim decide to force a settlement of the Sandpiper case by ruining Howard's reputation, Kim meets with Viola, ostensibly to apologize for abruptly leaving S&C. Viola tells Kim she admires Kim's commitment to helping pro bono clients who have nowhere else to turn, but the meeting is a ploy. S&C represents the Sandpiper Crossing nursing home chain, and Kim uses her conversation with Viola to obtain the name of the retired judge who will mediate the Sandpiper case.

==== Rand Casimiro ====
Rand Casimiro (portrayed by John Posey) is a retired judge and former colleague of Clifford Main, who is enlisted as the mediator in the Sandpiper Crossing class-action lawsuit. Kim and Jimmy hire an actor to impersonate Casimiro and stage photos depicting Jimmy offering Casimiro a $20,000 cash bribe, which they pass onto Howard Hamlin via his private investigator (who is in fact a con man working for Kim and Jimmy). Howard believes he recognizes Casimiro from the photos during the settlement conference and embarrasses himself in front of his peers by accusing Casimiro of corruption, derailing the meeting and forcing HHM to accept a lower settlement than they initially sought, when it is definitively revealed he did not see the actual Casimiro at the scene.

=== Other characters ===
==== Everett Acker ====
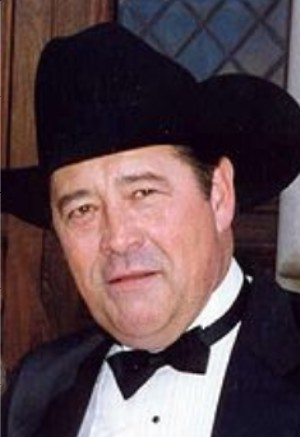
Barry Corbin

Everett Acker (portrayed by Barry Corbin) is a retiree whose home is on land leased from Mesa Verde Bank. Kim Wexler represents the bank in its attempt to evict Acker so it can construct a new call center. When Kim becomes sympathetic to Acker's refusal to leave, she persuades Jimmy (as Saul Goodman) to represent him.

As of 2004, Acker has lived at the same location since 1974. When Mesa Verde Bank begins buying out leases in order to construct a call center as part of its regional expansion, Acker becomes the last holdout. Though his lease includes a provision for the bank to buy him out at fair market value plus $5,000, he considers the buyout provision to be unfair, even with Mesa Verde's $18,000 bonus offer. Kim recommends to Kevin and Paige an alternate building site that will enable Mesa Verde to work around Acker's refusal to leave, but they insist on eviction. She asks Jimmy (as Saul) to represent Acker against Mesa Verde, and Acker agrees. Jimmy creates delays in Mesa Verde's eviction through several tricks, including changing Acker's street number and claiming the eviction notices are for the wrong address, creating fake Native American artifacts to be found by researchers, planting low-level radioactive material to have authorities test the site for hazardous waste, and passing off a spray-painted image of Jesus on Acker's home as a miracle that causes the religious faithful to consider it a shrine. Kim and Jimmy consider blackmailing Kevin into settling, but Kim changes her mind and offers an improved settlement, with her personally making up the difference between what Kevin agrees to pay and a $75,000 total. Jimmy says Acker already agreed to accept $45,000, so he concurs. Jimmy meets with Kim, Rich, Kevin, and Paige to complete the arrangement and stuns everyone by demanding $4 million. When Kevin ridicules this demand, Jimmy shows him rough cuts of commercials seeking plaintiffs for class-action lawsuits against Mesa Verde, which unfavorably depict Kevin's father, Don Wachtell. Jimmy also makes use of the blackmail material Kim declined to employ— photos that prove Mesa Verde's logo is based on an original photograph the bank did not obtain permission to use. Jimmy uses the threat of lawsuits and an injunction against displaying the logo to persuade Kevin to accept a settlement that includes $75,000 in cash for Acker and permission to remain in his home.

==== Hugo Archilleya ====
Hugo Archilleya (played by Pierre Barrera) is a former custodian at JP Wynne High School. When Walt had to leave class to vomit (a consequence of his chemotherapy), Hugo comforted him and cleaned up after him. After the DEA connects missing school equipment to methamphetamine production, Hugo is one of the initial suspects because of the access his custodial duties afford him. Hugo is soon placed under arrest for possession of marijuana and fired; after a search of his home, more marijuana is found but no methamphetamine or items that could connect him with the meth investigation.

==== Captain Bauer ====
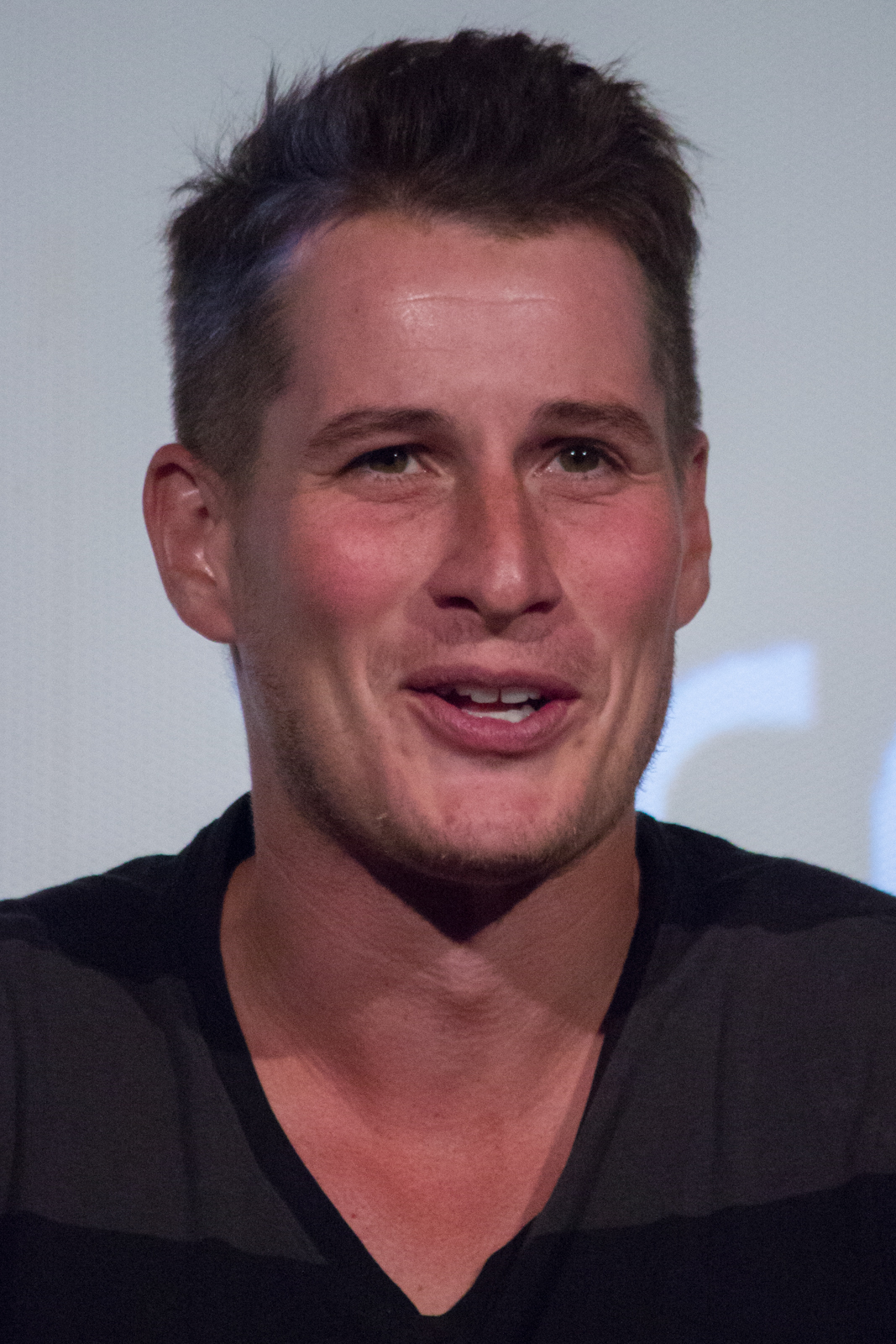
Brendan Fehr

Bauer (played by Brendan Fehr) is a captain in the Air Force whom Jimmy tricks into gaining him, his client Fudge and film crew access to an airbase. As part of Jimmy's scheme, Bauer mistakes Fudge as a war veteran and takes Jimmy's group to FIFI, a World War II-era Boeing B-29 Superfortress, where they film a commercial while Bauer gets water for Fudge. Bauer returns with a group of soldiers for a photo with Fudge. He later finds out about the deception and confronts Jimmy in his office, demanding him to stop broadcasting the commercial. When Jimmy refuses, Bauer storms off and yells that Jimmy cannot be trusted in front of his clients.

==== Ted Beneke ====
Theodore "Ted" Beneke (played by Christopher Cousins) is the president and owner of Beneke Fabricators. He gives Skyler her old job back as his accountant during the second season. Ted has always been attracted to Skyler but does not make any advances after she returns. Ted commits tax fraud to keep the company alive and save everyone's jobs, which he admits to Skyler when she finds irregularities in the company's books. Skyler has an affair with Ted in season three to exact revenge upon Walt, but ignores Ted's offer to leave some of her things at his house. When Walt finds out about their affair, he tries to confront Ted, who hides in his office. This escalates into a scene where Walt is escorted out by security guards and the company staff becomes aware of Skyler's relationship with Ted. Skyler gets angry at Ted when he shows up at her house to ask about their relationship, and she later severs both her personal and professional ties with him.

In season 4, Ted meets with Skyler, who is now running a car wash, and notifies her of an Internal Revenue Service (IRS) investigation into his company's taxes. Since Skyler kept the books, she can be linked to Ted's tax fraud, likely placing her entire family under surveillance, so she intervenes by pretending at Ted's meeting with the IRS to be an unqualified bookkeeper hired only for her looks. Her supposed incompetence forestalls a full investigation, provided Ted pays the back taxes and penalties. Skyler arranges to provide Ted the money by using the proceeds from Walt's meth production to have Saul pretend a long-lost dead relative in Luxembourg left Ted an inheritance. Saul discovers that instead of paying the IRS, Ted leased a new Mercedes and is using the funds to reopen his business. When Skyler urges Ted to pay the IRS first, he refuses, so Skyler tells him the money came from her. Ted still refuses to pay the IRS and Skyler perceives him to be blackmailing her into paying both his tax bill and the costs to reopen his business. Skyler has Saul send two of his men—Huell and Kuby—to force Beneke to write the check to the IRS. They succeed, but Ted panics and attempts to flee, tripping on a loose rug and crashing headfirst into a counter.

At the start of the fifth season, Saul informs Skyler that something happened to Ted, causing her to conclude that he died. Saul tells her that Ted is alive, but hospitalized. When Skyler visits him, she sees that Ted is rigidly sitting upright and wearing a halo brace. Ted tells Skyler he lied to medical personnel and police, claiming his broken neck resulted from an accidental fall, and that because he fears for the safety of his family, he will never mention how the injury occurred. Recognizing that Ted has been intimidated into keeping quiet about the source of his money, Skyler goes along with Ted's perception by coldly replying "Good" to his promise of silence.

==== Rebecca Bois ====
Rebecca Bois (played by Ann Cusack) is Chuck McGill's ex-wife and a concert violinist. Although their divorce was amicable, it is stated that Chuck's electromagnetic hypersensitivity started soon afterwards.

In 2002, Chuck attempted to reconcile and reconnect with Rebecca over dinner with Jimmy's help. He lies to Rebecca about his symptoms and becomes overwhelmed when Rebecca takes a phone call. Chuck slaps the phone from Rebecca's hand in a fit and rather than apologizing, calls Rebecca rude for taking a call at dinner. Rebecca leaves soon after.

Later Jimmy invites Rebecca to his disciplinary hearing while Chuck is on the stand. Chuck apologizes for hiding his disability from her to which she shows complete sympathy and understanding, wondering why he did not simply tell her in the first place. However, when it is shown that Chuck does not in fact suffer from EHS, Rebecca watches in horror as Chuck rants about Jimmy. After the hearing Rebecca tries to talk with Chuck in his house but he refuses to talk. She visits a celebrating Jimmy and Kim in their office and begs Jimmy to make amends with Chuck but Jimmy refuses. Realizing she was just a pawn to help his case, Rebecca tells Jimmy that Chuck was right about him.

After Chuck's death Rebecca attends his funeral crying profusely. Afterwards as Chuck's will is being read it is revealed that Chuck left his house (which is mostly a burnt-out wreck after Chuck's suicide) to Rebecca, although she allows Jimmy to take anything he wishes from it.

==== Brenda ====
Brenda (played by Sarah Minnich) is a former secretary at HHM. She is one of the many guests at Jesse's house when he throws parties to distract himself from his guilt over killing Gale, indicating she may have been dealing with the consequences of HHM's downfall.

==== David Brightbill ====
David Brightbill (portrayed by Jackamoe Buzzell) is a private investigator. After Jimmy sabotages Chuck's work for Mesa Verde Bank, Chuck hires David to find proof. When Chuck records Jimmy's confession and arranges for Jimmy to find out, David and Howard Hamlin spend time at Chuck's house because Chuck is sure Jimmy will try to steal the recording and wants them to observe firsthand. Jimmy later angrily breaks down Chuck's door and destroys the cassette, and David and Howard reveal themselves as witnesses, which enables Chuck to report Jimmy's crime to the police.

==== Maureen Bruckner ====
Maureen Bruckner (played by Poorna Jagannathan) is a specialist from Johns Hopkins Hospital hired by Gus to treat Hector after his stroke. She can speak Spanish. Gus later invites Dr. Bruckner to his house for dinner to celebrate Hector recuperating, but tells her they are ending the treatment when she discusses helping Hector to walk and talk again.

==== Dr. Caldera ====
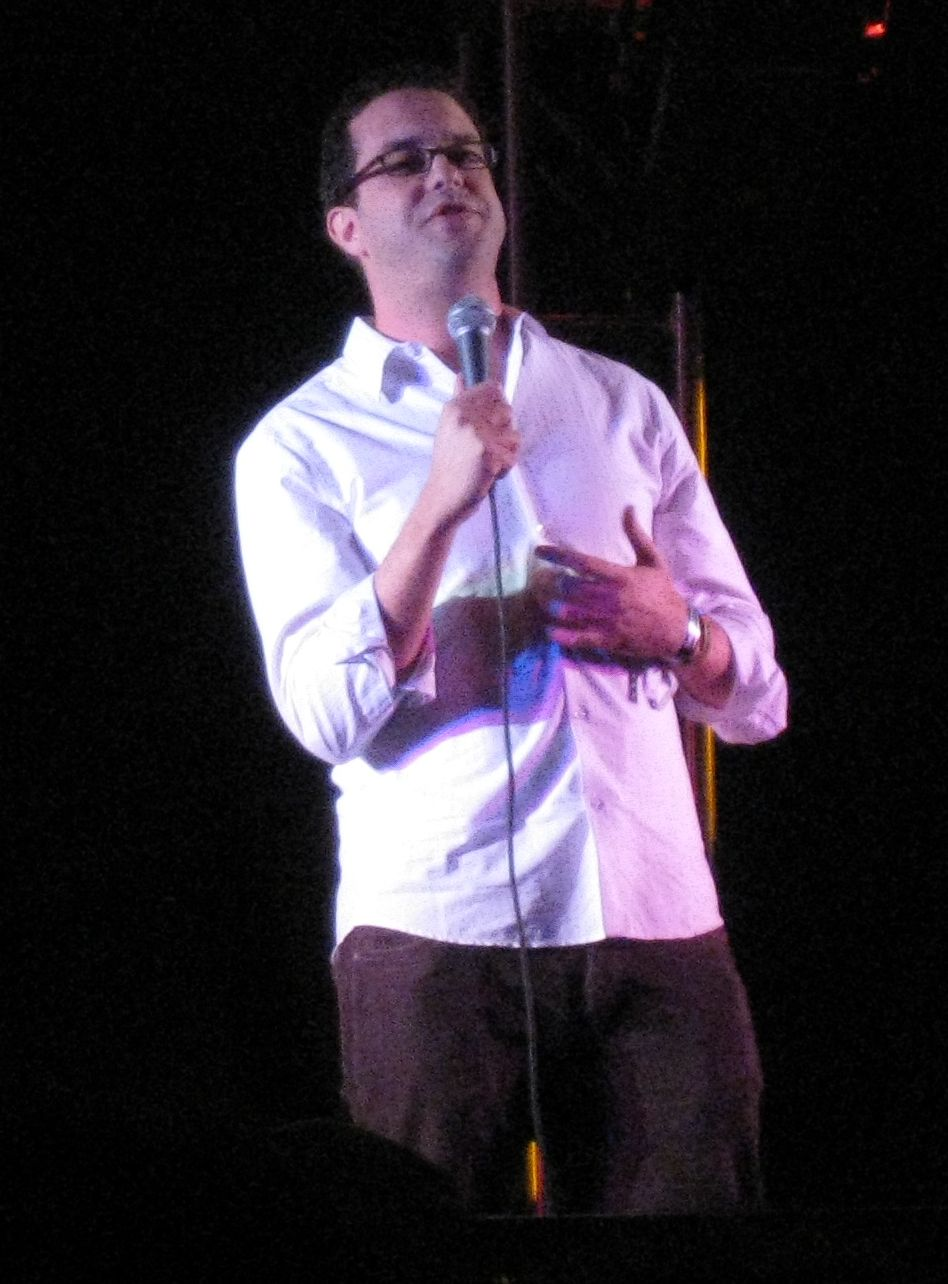
Joe DeRosa

Dr. Caldera (played by Joe DeRosa) is an Albuquerque veterinarian. He secretly serves as a middleman to put criminals in contact with each other. In one instance, when Daniel Wormald desires to have a bodyguard when he carries out a drug deal with Nacho Varga, he contacts Caldera, who puts three individuals including Mike Ehrmantraut in touch with Wormald. In addition, Caldera sometimes renders "off the books" medical aid to criminals, enabling them to avoid having their wounds reported to the police. Individuals who visit his office for criminal activities often bring pets with them, enabling Caldera's examination of the animal to serve as a cover for the visit's real purpose. As revealed in season 6's "Axe and Grind", Caldera has a connection to Ed Galbraith, the "disappearer". In the same episode, Caldera reveals that he is retiring from his role as a middleman and shows Jimmy and Kim his encoded notebook of criminal contacts that he intends to sell. In a flashforward in "Wine and Roses", Caldera's notebook is amongst the possessions being shown taken from Saul's mansion, suggesting that Saul is the one who eventually bought it from him.

==== Tomás Cantillo ====
Tomás Cantillo (played by Angelo Martinez) is Andrea Cantillo's younger brother. He murdered Jesse's friend Combo on the orders of rival drug dealers. After Jesse learns the truth, the dealers murder Tomás, possibly with the permission of their boss Gus Fring. Jesse's effort to seek revenge leads to a rift between Gus, Walt and Jesse.

==== Clovis ====
Clovis (played by Tom Kiesche) is Badger's cousin who operates a vehicle towing and repair service. When Jesse's RV quits running, Clovis charges him an exorbitant amount to tow and store the vehicle, due to its cargo. Clovis repairs the RV and catches Jesse sleeping in it after Jesse has scaled the fence (and destroyed a portable toilet in the process) after being evicted from his home. Clovis orders Jesse to pay for the repairs and property damage and then threatens to sell off Jesse's inventory to cover the repairs, when Jesse claims he cannot furnish immediate payment. Jesse again breaks into the gated lot and drives through the gate without paying for the repairs. He later returns to pay Clovis for the repairs and damages and arranges to store the RV inside Clovis's gated lot for $500 per week. Clovis later sells Jesse a used red Toyota Tercel hatchback. Jesse decides to retrieve the RV, but Walter has warned Clovis that the DEA is looking for it, forcing Clovis to bring it to a junkyard to be destroyed.

==== Louis Corbett ====
Louis Corbett (played by Kyle Swimmer in season one and Caleb Landry Jones in seasons two and three) is Walter Jr.'s best friend. They both attend JP Wynne High School. He frequently gives Walter Jr. rides to school and helps him set up a PayPal account for donations to Walter Jr.'s website.

==== David ====
David (played by Reed Diamond) is a sommelier at a restaurant apparently frequented by Gus. He is close with Gus, who had even hinted to having a romantic interest in him, and bonds with him over wine. After getting away with killing Lalo, Gus celebrates by conversing with him, with David offering him a bottle to try. Before he comes back, Gus leaves, unable to separate himself from his quest to avenge Max, his deceased partner.

==== Dr. Delcavoli ====
Dr. Delcavoli (played by David House) is Walt's physician during the first two seasons. He is said to be one of the top 10 oncologists in the United States.

==== Stephanie Doswell ====
Stephanie Doswell (played by Jennifer Hasty) is a realtor with Venture Realty Group. She hosts two open houses that Marie attends. During the second, she recognizes Marie from their last meeting and as the one who stole from a spoon collection at the previous house. She scuffles with Marie over her purse, before Marie is arrested. In Better Call Saul, she runs a tour of a house for Stacey Ehrmantraut, who buys it.

==== Kaylee Ehrmantraut ====
Kaylee Ehrmantraut (played by Kaija Roze Bales in Breaking Bad, Faith Healey in Better Call Saul season 1, Abigail Zoe Lewis in Better Call Saul seasons 2-4 and Juliet Donenfeld in Better Call Saul seasons 5 and 6) is Mike Ehrmantraut's granddaughter, whom Mike occasionally spends time with. After Mike's death, Jesse decides to deliver a bag containing $2.5 million to Kaylee, but Walter stops the transfer.

==== Stacey Ehrmantraut ====
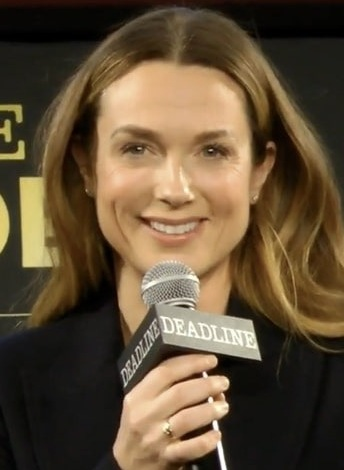
Kerry Condon

Stacey Ehrmantraut (portrayed by Kerry Condon) is Mike Ehrmantraut's widowed daughter-in-law and the mother of Kaylee, Mike's granddaughter.

==== Fran ====
Fran (portrayed by Debrianna Mansini) is a waitress at Loyola's Family Restaurant who often serves Mike, a regular customer. According to series creator Vince Gilligan, she was named after the original owner of Walter White's house.

==== Cheryl Hamlin ====
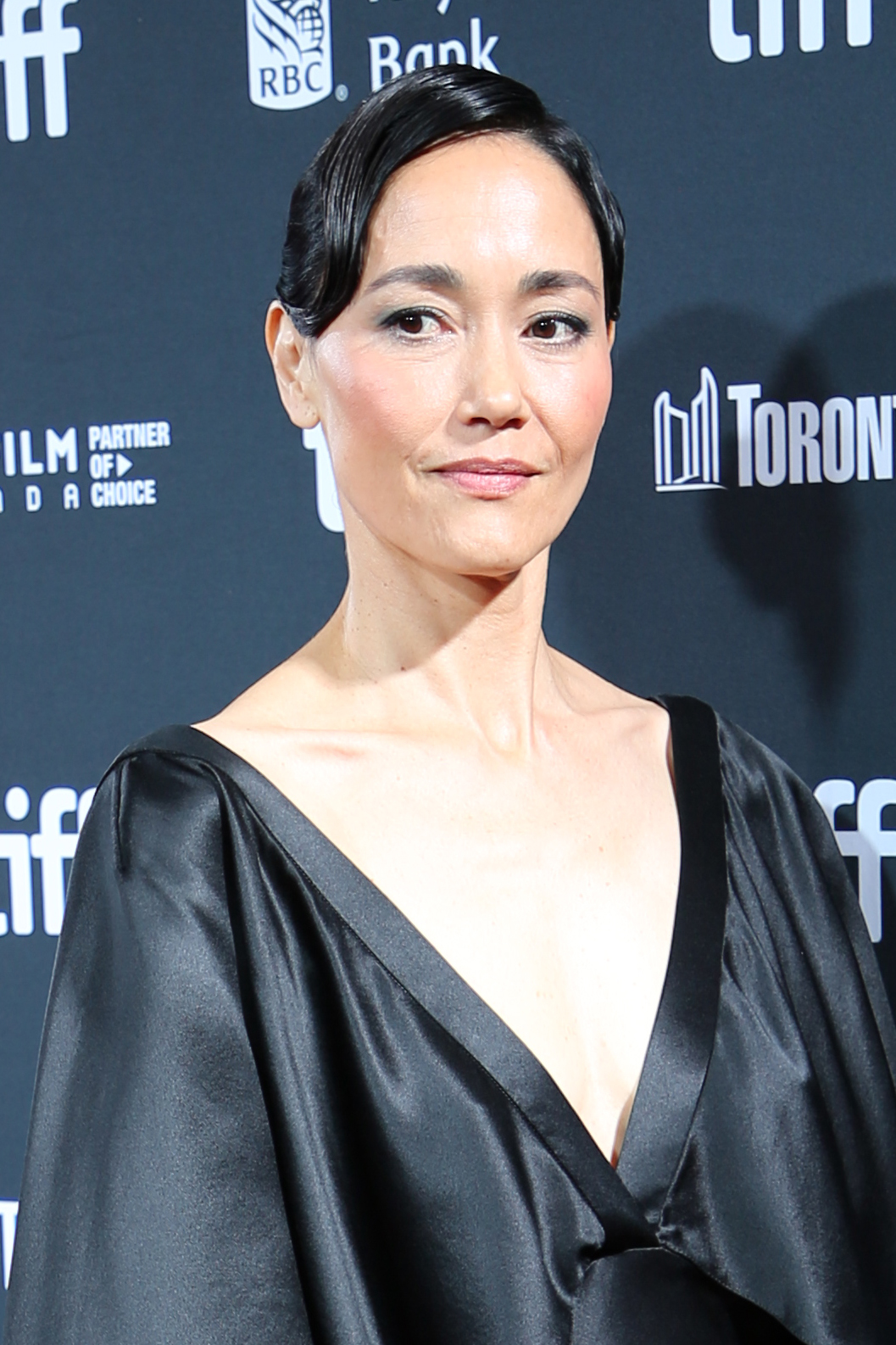
Sandrine Holt

Cheryl Hamlin (portrayed by Sandrine Holt) is Howard Hamlin's wife. In "Axe and Grind", Howard presents a coffee topped with the latte art of a peace sign to Cheryl, from whom he is obviously estranged. She dismissively pours it into a travel mug, destroying the art. Howard tells her about the problem he has been having with Jimmy and says that he is attempting to solve it.

Cheryl is widowed in the episode "Plan and Execution" when Lalo Salamanca shoots and kills Howard. In "Fun and Games", Cheryl is present at Howard's HHM memorial service. Jimmy and Kim attempt to provide condolences, but she mentions that Howard informed her of their harassment campaign. When she expresses suspicions of Jimmy and Kim's story about Howard's death, because she does not believe he used cocaine, Kim fabricates a story about seeing Howard abusing drugs while she was still at HHM. Kim then shifts blame by suggesting Cheryl was inattentive and failed to notice Howard's supposed drug problem, causing Cheryl to break down in tears.

After deciding to confess in 2010, Kim visits Cheryl with an affidavit detailing Kim and Jimmy's destruction of Howard's reputation, as well as the real circumstances surrounding his death, keeping secret only her knowledge of Jimmy's identity and location. Kim says she has given a copy of the document to the district attorney, but surmises that she will not face prosecution given the lack of physical evidence and witnesses. When Jimmy hires Bill Oakley as his defense counsel, Oakley informs Jimmy of Kim's confession and suggests that Cheryl has ample grounds for a wrongful death lawsuit, stating that Cheryl is "out shopping for lawyers as we speak."

==== Troy Hoffman and Jack Fensky ====
Troy Hoffman (played by Lane Garrison) and his sergeant Jack Fensky (played by Billy Malone) are corrupt Philadelphia police officers and former colleagues of Mike Ehrmantraut's son Matt. They profited from gang activity and offered Matt a cut of dirty money. Matt initially refused and was pressured by Mike into accepting it, but the two crooked cops ambushed and killed Matt so he would not report them to their superiors. Hoffman and Fensky covered their tracks, but Mike figured out they were responsible for murdering Matt and avenged Matt's death by killing them.

==== Old Joe ====
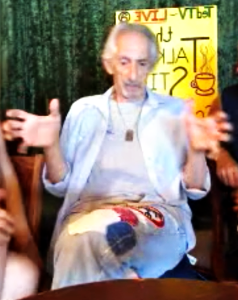
Larry Hankin

Old Joe (played by Larry Hankin) is the owner of a local junkyard. He aids Walt and Jesse on several occasions by using his car crusher in addition to sharing his knowledge of the legal limits on police procedure and evidence gathering. He also provides the magnet system used to wipe the evidence from Gus's laptop, and constructs the portable laboratory equipment used in the Vamonos Pest undercover meth lab operation. In El Camino: A Breaking Bad Movie, Jesse contacts him in order to get rid of Todd's El Camino, which Joe agrees to do for free. However, Joe discovers that the police just activated the LoJack GPS tracker, causing him to flee, while advising Jesse, Skinny Pete and Badger to do the same.

==== Julie ====
Julie (played by Audrey Moore) is a secretary at Hamlin, Hamlin & McGill. She delivers documents and letters to employees and sometimes attends meetings with them.

==== Ken ====
Ken (played by Kyle Bornheimer) is a stockbroker with an obnoxious personality. He drives a BMW convertible with a license plate reading "Ken Wins" and is often loudly boasting into his Bluetooth headset. Ken steals Walter's parking space at his credit union and annoys him with his phone conversation. When Walt later sees Ken pulling up at a gas station, he retaliates by shorting the battery of Ken's unattended car with a squeegee, causing it to burst into flames. Ken also appears in Better Call Saul, in which Jimmy and Kim con him into ordering expensive Zafiro Añejo tequila.

==== Betsy and Craig Kettleman ====
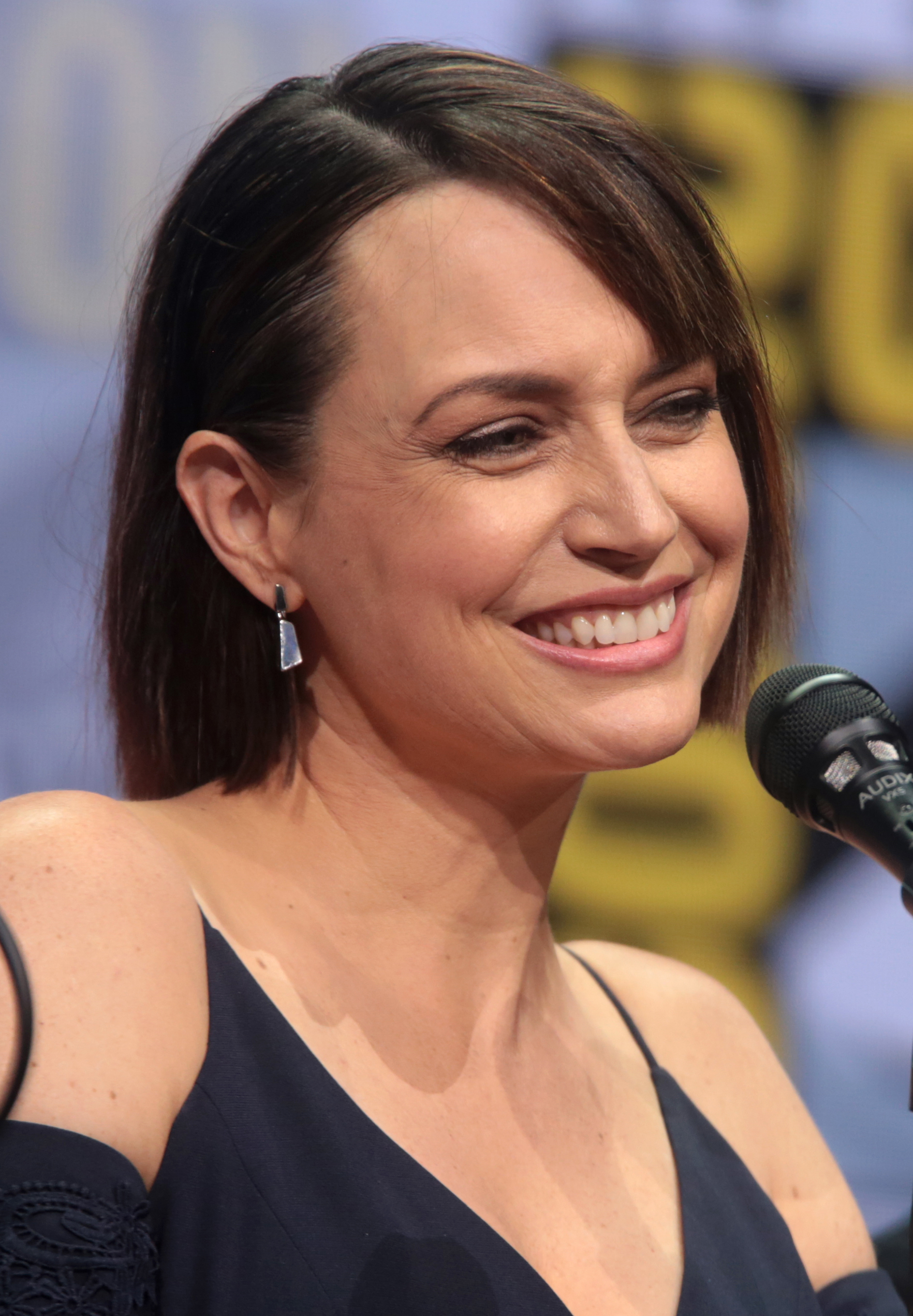
Julie Ann Emery

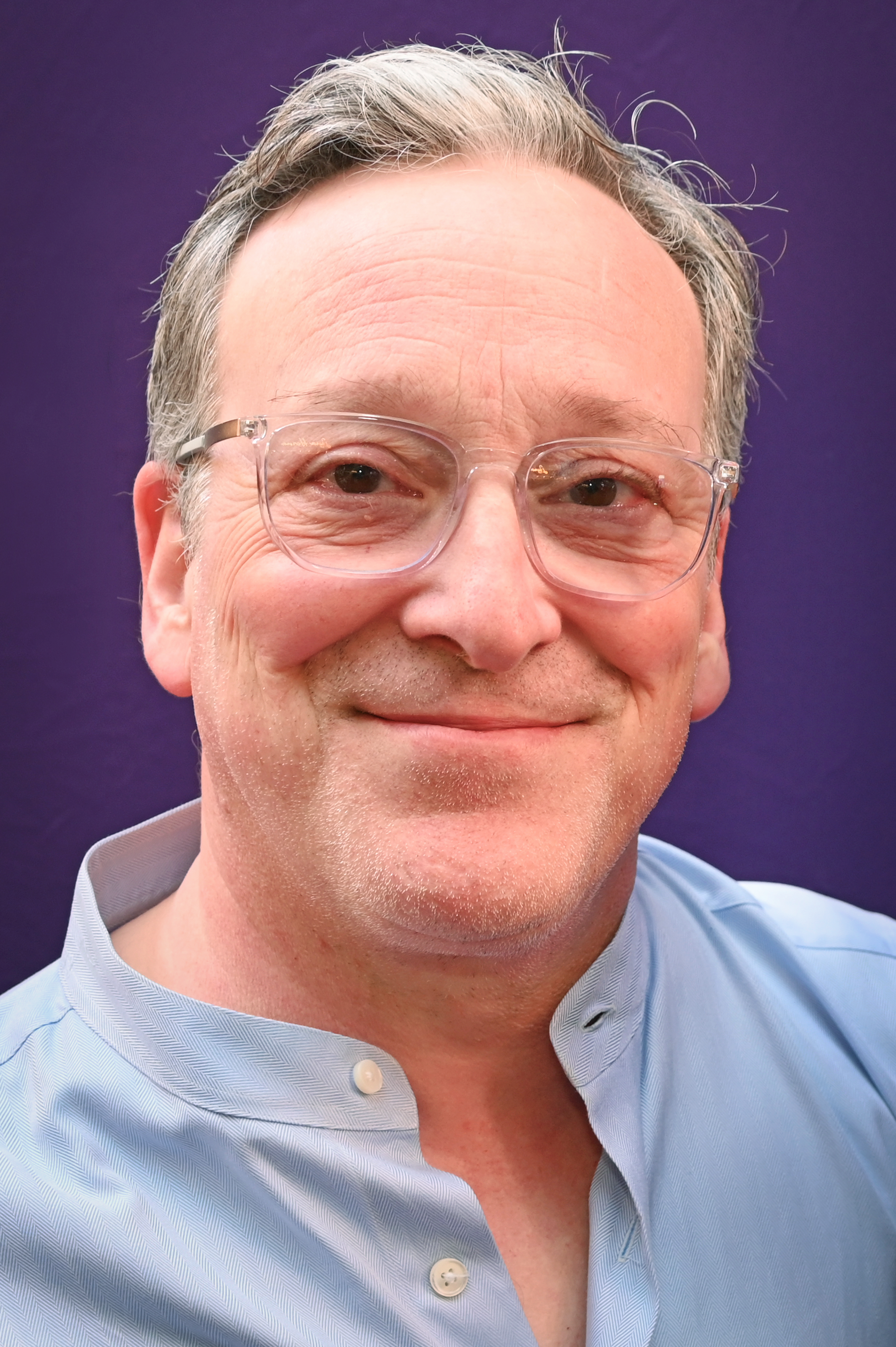
Jeremy Shamos

Betsy Kettleman (played by Julie Ann Emery) and her husband Craig Kettleman (played by Jeremy Shamos) initially appear as clients of Hamlin, Hamlin & McGill (HHM), and later Jimmy McGill. Craig, the county treasurer, is being investigated for the disappearance of $1.6 million in government funds and considers hiring Jimmy. He and his wife meet with Jimmy at a diner but Betsy is hesitant. They decide to go to HHM, which angers Jimmy. A few days later, the Kettlemans receive an anonymous tip that their family is in danger. The call was made by Jimmy, who fears Nacho might hurt the family to steal the stolen cash. The Kettlemans and their children decide to stage a kidnapping and camp out in the hills behind their home. Jimmy finds them and discovers they are in possession of the stolen cash. They pay him $30,000 to remain quiet. At a meeting with Kim Wexler of HHM, the Kettlemans consider a plea deal that includes return of the money and a sixteen-month prison sentence for Craig. Betsy wants to go to trial but Kim tells her that Craig faces 30 years in prison if he is convicted. Betsy rejects the plea deal, fires Kim, and hires Jimmy. Jimmy counsels the Kettlemans to accept the plea bargain but Betsy once again refuses. She blackmails Jimmy into helping them by pointing out that returning the money will implicate him, since they gave him cash to maintain his silence. With Mike's help, Jimmy steals the cash from the Kettlemans and delivers it to the prosecutor handling their case. Betsy threatens to have Jimmy arrested by reporting the bribe he took but he responds that if he is guilty of taking a bribe, she is guilty of offering one. Betsy and Craig reluctantly accept the plea deal Kim negotiated, realizing that having one parent go to prison is a better alternative than depriving their children of both parents.

After Craig's release from prison, the Kettlemans become proprietors of a shady tax preparation service. Kim and Jimmy scheme to ruin Howard Hamlin's reputation as part of their plan to force a resolution of the Sandpiper case so Jimmy can obtain his share of the multimillion-dollar judgment or settlement sooner. To that end, Jimmy cons the Kettlemans into believing they have grounds for a lawsuit against Howard. They attempt to hire Cliff Main to represent them by claiming that Howard provided ineffective counsel during Craig's embezzlement case because he supposedly used cocaine. Cliff declines to take the case, but as Jimmy and Kim intended, he begins to wonder if Howard is a drug user. Jimmy subsequently attempts to bribe the Kettlemans to keep quiet about their role in smearing Howard, but when they refuse the cash Kim coerces them by threatening to report their tax preparation scam to the IRS. The Kettlemans are cowed into compliance, but Jimmy disappoints Kim by giving the Kettlemans the money anyway.

==== Lawson ====
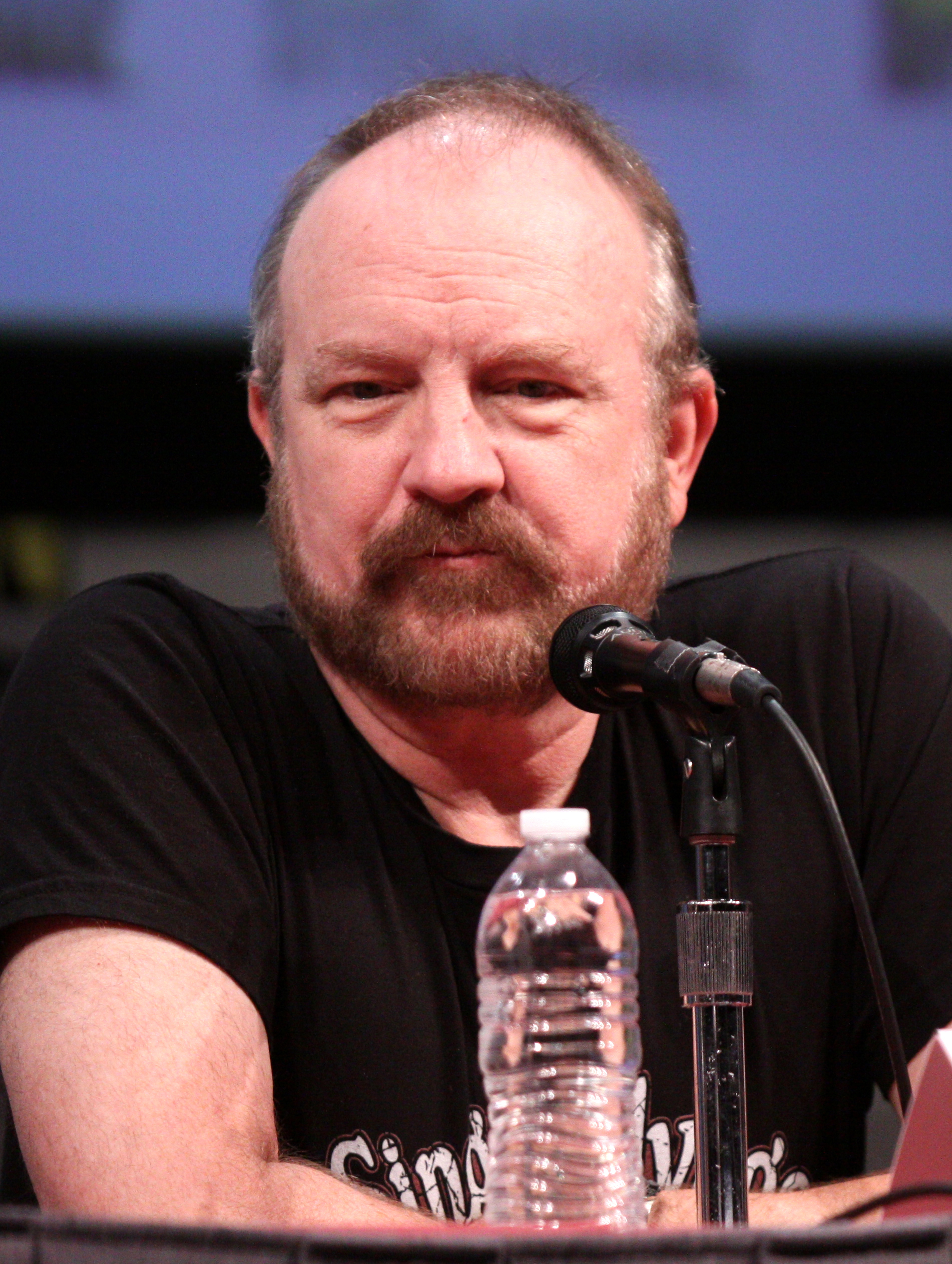
Jim Beaver

Lawson (played by Jim Beaver) is Walter White and Mike Ehrmantraut's gun dealer. He sold Walt a .38 caliber snub handgun (a Ruger LCR) with the serial number filed off, and previously an M40A1 sniper rifle which Mike had intended to use to kill Tuco Salamanca and then Hector Salamanca. Walt later purchases an M60 machine gun from Lawson, which he uses to kill Jack Welker and his gang.

==== Group Leader ====
The Group Leader (played by Jere Burns) is a counselor who leads group therapy sessions at Narcotics Anonymous. His actual name is not revealed. He takes a calm, non-judgmental approach to leading discussions and emphasizes that those attending his sessions are there not to improve themselves, but to learn self-acceptance. During an outdoor session at a campfire, he reveals to Jesse and other recovering addicts that in July 1992, while drunk on vodka and high on cocaine, he killed his six-year-old daughter by accidentally running her over with his car. Jesse, still reeling from Jane's death, asks the Group Leader how can he not hate himself for what happened. The Group Leader responds that self-hatred and guilt stand in the way of achieving true change. The Group Leader is seen again in Season 4, when Jesse returns to a session distraught about killing Gale. During the session, Jesse breaks down and yells at the Group Leader, claiming that his philosophy about "accepting yourself" for making mistakes is wrong and people should be judged for the things they have done. Jesse then asks the Group Leader if he just accepts himself for killing his daughter and admits to the whole group that the only reason he comes to these meetings in the first place is to sell meth to them. He asks the Group Leader if he is okay with that, to which the group leader responds, "No." Jesse retorts, "About time", and leaves the session, never to return.

==== Cal and Lars Lindholm ====
Calvin "Cal" and Laurentius "Lars" Lindholm (played by Daniel Spenser Levine and Steven Levine respectively) are twin brothers and skateboarders who run scams in which they pretend to be hit by cars while skating and demand money. They try to scam Jimmy but he is not fooled. Jimmy later plans to scam Betsy Kettleman in an attempt to convince her use his legal services and enlists Cal and Lars, but the skateboarders end up trying to scam another woman instead, who turns out to be Tuco Salamanca's grandmother. This leads to Tuco capturing Jimmy and the twins and breaking the skateboarders' legs after Jimmy persuades him not to kill them.

==== Donald Margolis ====
John de Lancie

Donald Margolis (played by John de Lancie) is Jane's father. He owns the building his daughter managed for him. He sent Jane to rehab once before and goes with her to recovery meetings. Donald becomes furious when he discovers that his daughter is back on heroin, suspecting Jesse is at fault (in fact, it is the other way around; she initiated Jesse to heroin, although they are both enabling each other). He nearly calls the police but relents when Jane promises to go back into rehab. Depressed, he goes to a bar and strikes up a conversation with a stranger about the heartache of raising children—that stranger turns out to be Walter White, who has recently been blackmailed by Donald's daughter Jane, although he does not realize the coincidence at the moment. Donald's words inspire Walter to help Jesse get clean from heroin. Walt returns to Jesse's apartment and witnesses Jane choking to death on her vomit while intoxicated on heroin. Heartbroken, Donald is present when the paramedics remove Jane's body and hardly reacts to Jesse's presence. A month later, he returns to work as an air traffic controller while still distraught and causes a mid-air collision of two airplanes just above Albuquerque. The collision kills 167 people—which explains the recurring images in the Season 2 flash-forwards of a burned pink teddy bear floating in Walter's pool. Shortly after the incident, Walter hears via his in-car radio that Margolis is rushed to the hospital after a self-inflicted gunshot wound; however, Walt turns the radio off before Margolis's fate is revealed. Later on, in the episode "Fly", Walter recalls that unlikely sequence of events, telling Jesse about the encounter at the bar (he only realized that this man was Jane's father after he saw him on the news following the disaster), and wonders about the possible meaning of the coincidence.

==== Carmen Molina ====
Carmen Molina (played by Carmen Serano) is the assistant principal at JP Wynne High School, where Walt teaches and which Walt Jr. attends. In Season 3, Walt tries to seduce her (as an attempt at revenge for Skyler's infidelity with Ted), resulting in him being placed on an indefinite sabbatical. In Season 5, she has been promoted to principal.

==== Mrs. Nguyen ====
Mrs. Nguyen (portrayed by Eileen Fogarty) is the owner of Day Spa and Nail, the nail salon in which Jimmy McGill's back room office is located. She frequently chides Jimmy for drinking the cucumber water infusion she makes available to salon customers and employees and objects to Jimmy's clients waiting in the area where she provides services to hers. When Jimmy is hired by Davis & Main, his company car is delivered to Day Spa and Nail, and Mrs. Nguyen's awestruck staff huddle around the new Mercedes sedan. Before he departs, he jokingly asks if Mrs. Nguyen is going to give him a goodbye hug and she shakes her head no before walking back inside. Jimmy finds himself unable to sleep in his new apartment, so he returns to the salon. Mrs. Nguyen discovers him the next morning, and when she refuses him a cup of coffee, he tells her that the sooner she gives him the coffee, the sooner he will leave.

During the suspension of his law license, Jimmy starts a business reselling prepaid cellular phones. Mrs. Nguyen objects to him storing the phones at the salon, but Jimmy says that because he pays rent, he can do what he wants with the space. He appeases her by offering her a phone, which she accepts, but she also warns him that get rich quick schemes are usually unsuccessful. After Jimmy's first bar association hearing, when he discovers his suspension will be continued and argues with Kim, Mrs. Nguyen discovers him crying in his office. She assumes Kim and Jimmy are married, shares a drink with him, and offers him relationship advice. After Jimmy begins practicing law as Saul Goodman, and word of his representation of the Salamancas gets out, his office is flooded with potential criminal defense clients, causing an obviously annoyed Mrs. Nguyen to evict him.

==== Pamela ====
Pamela Orbic (played by Julie Dretzin) is a divorce attorney hired by Skyler in the third season. Skyler confides in Pamela that Walter is a drug dealer, and Pamela urges her to contact the police.

==== Gretchen and Elliott Schwartz ====
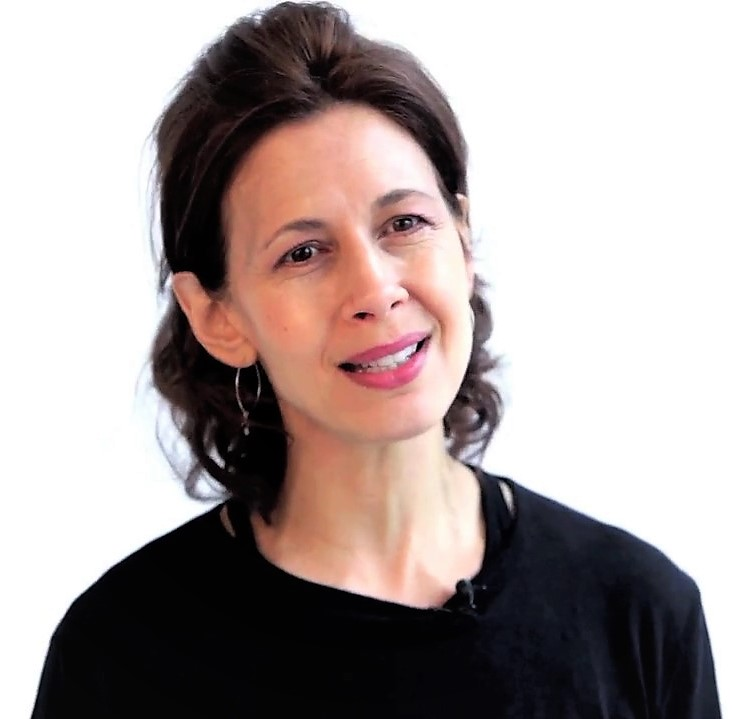
Jessica Hecht

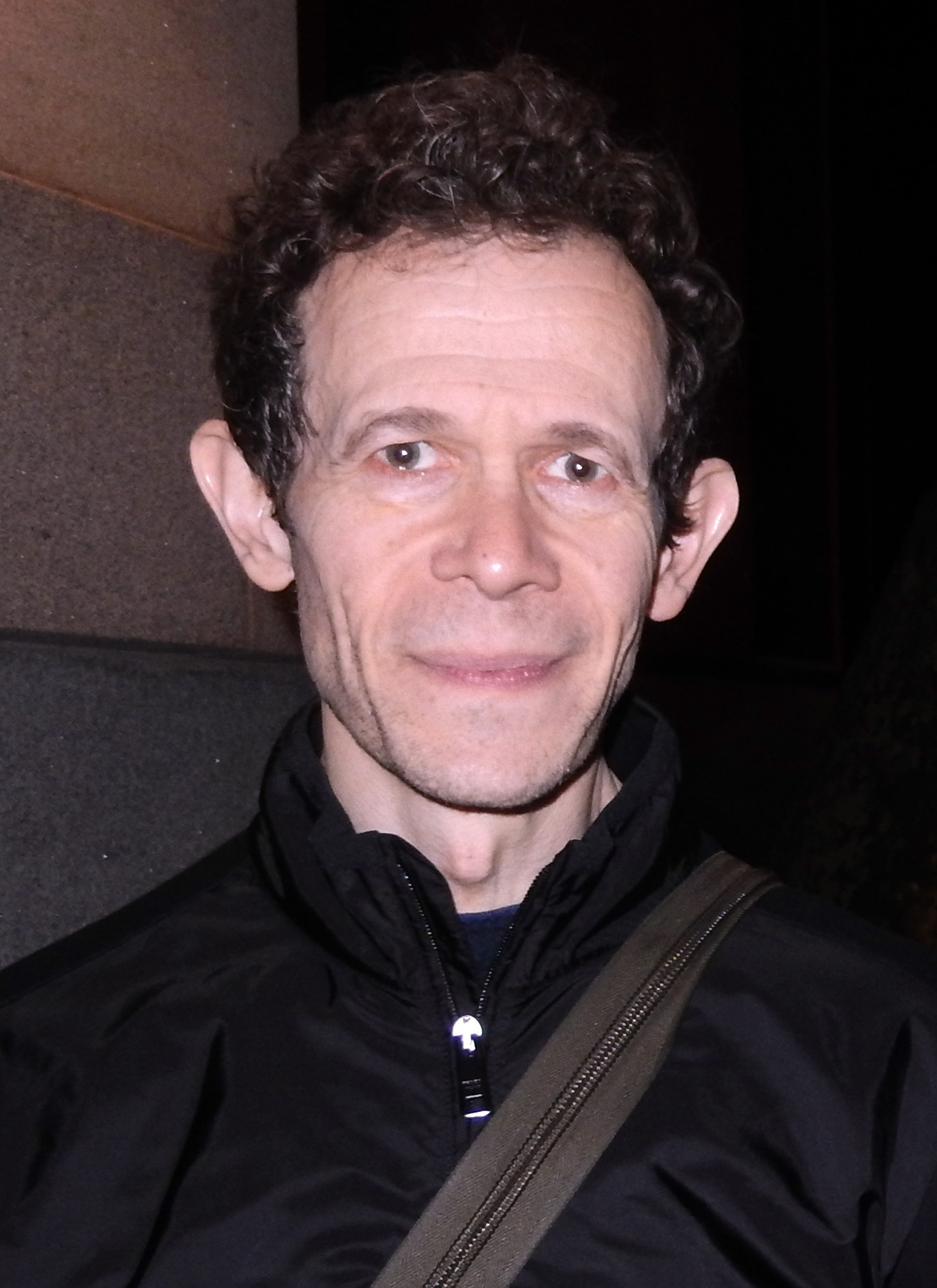
Adam Godley

Gretchen Schwartz (played by Jessica Hecht) is Walt's former college chemistry assistant and now co-owner of Gray Matter, a successful pharmaceutical company. A former romantic interest of Walter's, she is married to Walter's former partner and friend, Elliott Schwartz (played by Adam Godley), who co-created Gray Matter. During their relationship, Gretchen took Walt to visit her parents over a weekend. Soon afterwards, Walt suddenly left all his research and sold his ownership stake in Gray Matter. Gretchen later married Elliott, and Gray Matter then became so successful that their company was worth 2.16 billion dollars by the time of the show, and Gretchen and Elliott became wealthy, leaving Walt bitter about their success.

When Walt begins chemotherapy treatments for his cancer, he conceals the fact that he is paying for it with proceeds from his drug dealing by telling Skyler that Gretchen and Elliott are paying for it. Gretchen finds Walt lied to his family, and is horrified when Walter angrily and bitterly blames her and Elliott for ruining his life. Gretchen promises to maintain the lie for Walt as long as he tells Skyler that the Schwartzes can no longer fund his treatments. Skyler becomes suspicious, contacts Gretchen, and learns that the Schwartzes did not pay any of Walt's medical bills, and deduces that Walter must be getting the money through illegal means.

In the series' final two episodes, "Granite State" and "Felina", Walt is in hiding in New Hampshire and preparing to turn himself in to the DEA. While at a bar, he sees an interview with the Schwartzes on Charlie Rose, who denounce Walt and minimize his involvement in starting Gray Matter. Instead of waiting for the police, Walt steals a car and returns to New Mexico. At Gretchen and Elliott's home, Walt claims to have snipers aiming rifles with laser sights at them, which he uses to coerce them into agreeing to use his remaining money to establish a trust for Walter Jr. while masking the source as a contribution from their charitable foundation. Unknown to the Schwartzes, the snipers are actually Badger and Skinny Pete, who are using laser pointers to simulate rifle sights. The threat causes Gretchen and Elliott to agree to Walt's demand.

==== Drew Sharp ====
Drew Sharp (played by Samuel Webb) is an inquisitive teenager living in McKinley County in northwestern New Mexico. In the opening scenes of "Dead Freight", Sharp is on his motorcycle riding around the desert scrub. He finds a tarantula, which he places in a jar; he then hears a train coming down the tracks and sets off to see it, only to encounter Walter White, Jesse Pinkman, and Todd Alquist as they are celebrating their success in stealing the methylamine from the tanker car on the train Kuby helped them stop. Walt, Jesse, and Todd turn off the engine to their pump and discover Sharp and his motorcycle on the other side of the trestle. When Sharp waves hello, Todd waves back then pulls out his pistol and kills Sharp in cold blood, to Jesse's dismay.

Sharp's body and motorcycle are hauled back to Vamonos Pest in Albuquerque, where Walter, Mike and Todd dispose of them, once again using hydrofluoric acid, and Todd keeps the tarantula. Later on in that episode, KOB Reporter Antoinette Antonio reports on the disappearance of Sharp and how the search for Sharp has now expanded beyond McKinley County. The killing of Sharp is a critical turning point for Jesse, who ultimately severs his ties with Walter's operation due to his horror and grief at the young boy's death. After Walter belatedly leaves Jesse his share of the buyout money, Jesse seeks Saul Goodman's help to send half of the $5 million to Sharp's family, but is rebuffed as such a move would draw the attention of the authorities. The murder of Sharp is mentioned in the tape Hank and Gomez make of Jesse confessing to his and Walter's criminal history.

In El Camino: A Breaking Bad Movie, it is revealed that Todd kept Drew's tarantula at his apartment.

==== Sobchak ====
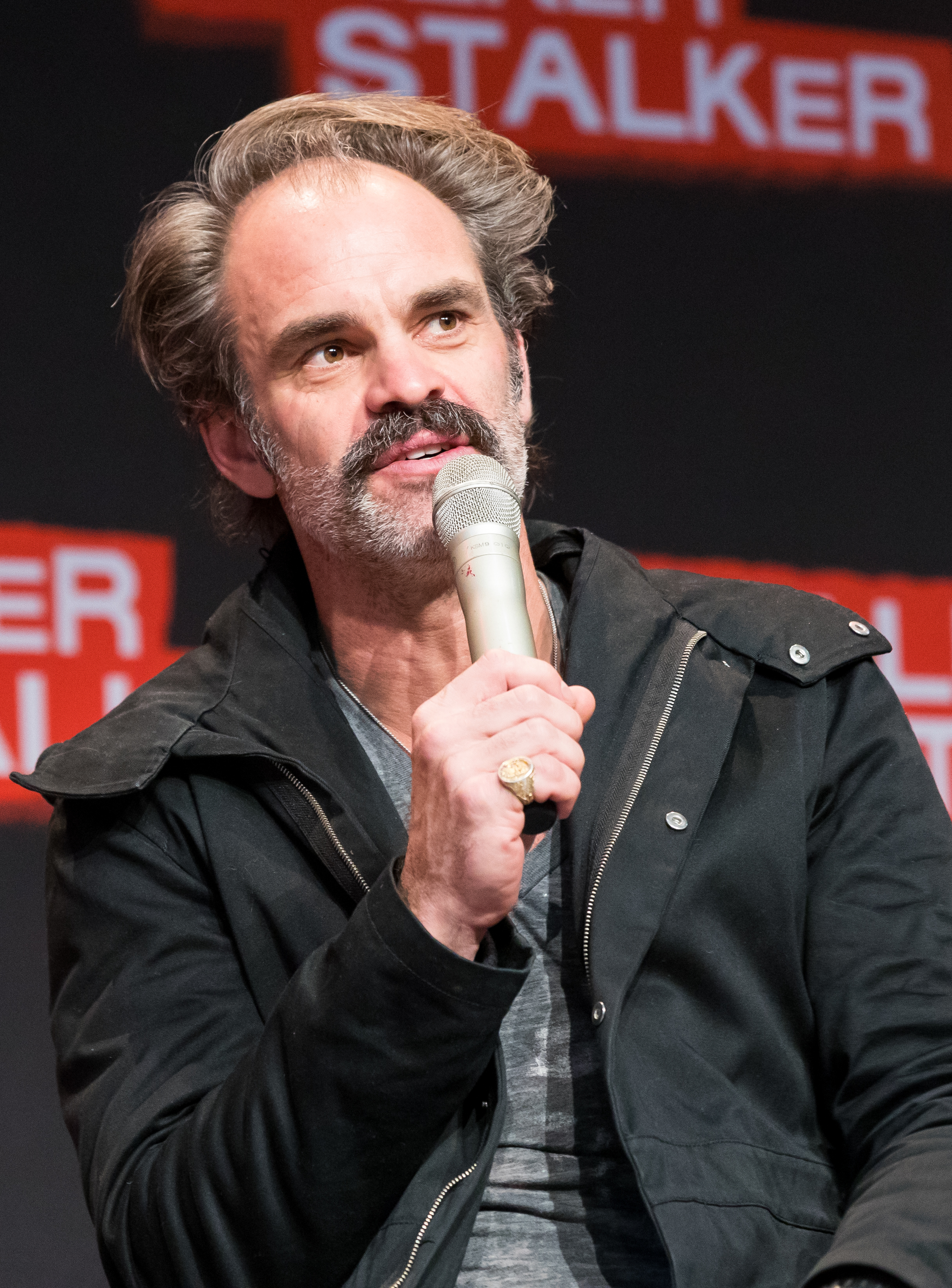
Steven Ogg

Sobchak (played by Steven Ogg) is a criminal and "off the books" investigator. Pryce considered him, Mike, and Man Mountain as bodyguards when Pryce first met with Nacho. Man Mountain fled after Mike disarmed Sobchak. Kim and Jimmy later hire Sobchak (under his "professional" name Mr. X) to find "dirt" on Kevin Wachtell. He tells them that he could "take him out to the desert" to acquire more information, which causes Kim and Jimmy to ask him to leave.

==== Spooge ====
Spooge (played by David Ury) is a drug addict who steals meth from Skinny Pete at knifepoint. Jesse later accosts Spooge in Spooge's house and attempts to retrieve the stolen drugs or cash payment. Spooge attempts to repay Jesse by breaking open an ATM he has stolen from a convenience store. While attempting to drill into the machine from the bottom, he begins verbally abusing his wife (played by Dale Dickey), who tips the ATM, crushing Spooge's head and killing him instantly. Jesse's associates and rivals attribute Spooge's death to Jesse, which strengthens his street credibility and reputation for ruthlessness until the wife confesses. Spooge has a young son, whose neglect causes Jesse to realize the negative consequences of the drug business. After Spooge's death, Jesse sits the boy on the front steps of the home, instructs him not to go back inside, having called 911 and leaves the phone line open so police can trace the call, making sure that the boy will be cared for. In Better Call Saul, Spooge is one of the first clients seeking to engage Jimmy McGill as Saul Goodman after word gets out to Albuquerque's criminals about Saul's defense of Lalo Salamanca.

==== Mr. Ughetta ====
Mr. Ughetta (portrayed by Michael Chieffo) is a commissioner of the New Mexico Banking Board. He and fellow board members meet with Chuck and Howard, along with their clients Kevin and Paige, over Mesa Verde Bank's proposed branch in Scottsdale, Arizona. Ughetta and the rest of the board decide to postpone the application for six weeks due to the address in the documents being forged by Jimmy.

==== Manuel Varga ====
Manuel Varga (portrayed by Juan Carlos Cantú) is Nacho Varga's father and the owner of an upholstery shop. Nacho has gone to great lengths to prevent Manuel from learning about his role in the Salamanca drug trade, but as Gus starts to undermine the routes the Salamancas use to smuggle drugs into the U.S., Hector Salamanca considers using Manuel's shop as a front. Nacho is forced to reveal his role in the Salamanca organization to Manuel so Manuel will not put himself at risk by rejecting Hector's offer out of hand. When Nacho is shot as part of Gus's plan to undermine the Salamancas, a reluctant Manuel allows Nacho to recuperate at his house. When Gus forces Nacho to work as his mole, Nacho hides cash and fake Canadian ID cards for himself and his father so they can flee Albuquerque if necessary. When Lalo Salamanca arrives to take over the Salamanca operation, Gus threatens Manuel's life to coerce Nacho into providing inside information. Nacho attempts to protect him by having an associate offer to buy Manuel's shop for more than it is worth so Manuel can retire and move from Albuquerque. Manuel guesses that Nacho is behind the offer and confronts him, saying that if Nacho's drug dealing has made him fearful, he should flee or turn himself into authorities, but that Manuel will not sell and will not leave. After Gus's attempt to kill Lalo he deflects blame by implicating Nacho, and the cartel places a bounty on him. Nacho realizes telling the Salamancas and cartel leaders that Gus had no role in the attack on Lalo is the only way to protect Manuel, but will also result in his own death. He places a farewell call to Manuel, then surrenders to Gus in exchange for Mike's guarantee of Manuel's safety. Mike later informs Manuel of Nacho's death and promises revenge on the Salamancas. Manuel dismisses Mike's promise as a never-ending cycle of bloodshed and tells him he is no different from the criminals with whom he associates.

==== Kevin Wachtell ====
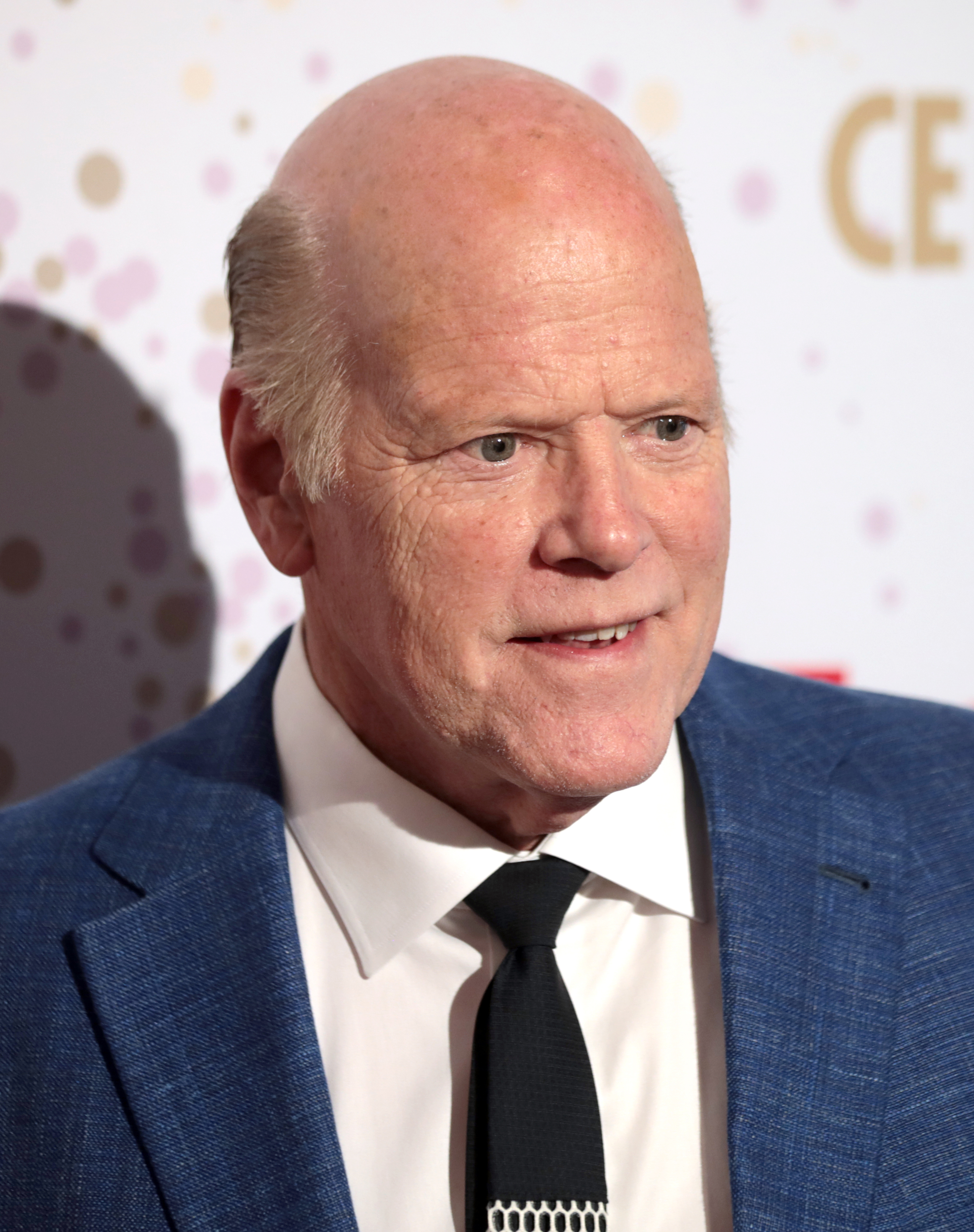
Rex Linn

Kevin Wachtell (portrayed by Rex Linn) is the CEO of Mesa Verde Bank. He took over the bank from his father Don in the early 2000s and presides over its expansion into a large regional institution. Kim uses her acquaintanceship with Mesa Verde's counsel Paige to secure Mesa Verde as a client for Hamlin, Hamlin & McGill. When Kim leaves HHM, Kevin agrees that Mesa Verde will be a client of her new practice, but Chuck succeeds at winning them back. Jimmy's sabotage of Chuck's Mesa Verde work causes Kevin to take the bank's business back to Kim. Kim later uses her relationship with Kevin to become a partner at Schweikart & Cokely (S&C) and lead the firm's new banking division. Kevin's stubborn refusal to accept Kim's advice on handling the eviction of Everett Acker causes Kim to turn the Mesa Verde account over to S&C and leave the firm to concentrate on pro bono criminal defense work she finds more interesting than banking law.

==== Fred Whalen ====
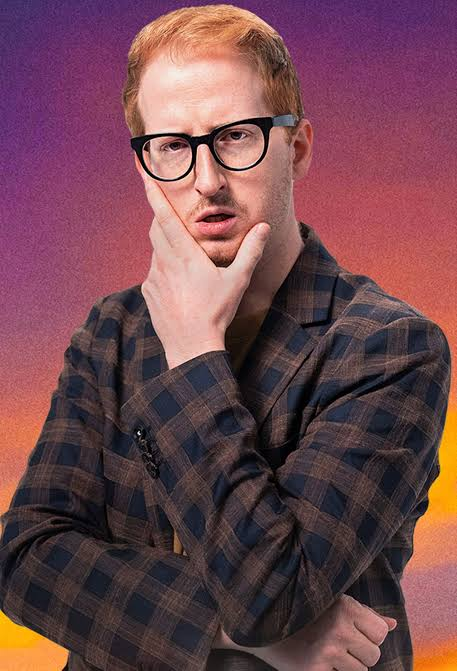
James Austin Johnson

Fred Whalen (portrayed by James Austin Johnson) is an employee of Albuquerque TravelWire, a wire transfer agency. Mike Ehrmantraut questions Fred about Werner Ziegler's whereabouts in "Winner". Fred is initially hesitant, but after Mike claims Werner is his missing brother-in-law and has early-stage dementia and diabetes, Fred reveals that Werner made phone calls at TravelWire and left using a car service. Fred also lets Mike review CCTV footage in hopes of learning Werner's destination.

Lalo Salamanca later visits TravelWire and asks similar questions about Werner. Fred becomes suspicious and declines to cooperate. After Fred suggests that Lalo call the police, TravelWire gets a call. When Fred finishes the call, he sees that Lalo is no longer in the store's lobby. Just as Fred notices a loose ceiling panel inside his locked booth, Lalo drops in and trains a gun on him. Lalo examines the footage, murders Fred, and burns down the TravelWire to destroy the evidence.

In "Wexler v. Goodman", Mike works under an assumed name to persuade a witness who was outside TravelWire to identify Lalo's car to the Albuquerque police and Lalo is arrested under an alias. A police report reveals that Lalo had bludgeoned Fred to death, resulting in a skull fracture. In "JMM", Gus wants Lalo released, so he has Mike provide Saul details of the actions that led to Lalo's arrest. Fred's family attends the bail hearing, at which Saul accuses the police of witness tampering, evidence that results in the judge granting bail to Lalo.

==== Holly White ====
Holly White (played by Haven Tomlin in Season 4, Elanor Anne Wenrich in the first half of Season 5, and Moira Bryg MacDonald in the latter half) is Skyler and Walt's infant daughter and Walt Jr.'s younger sister. Walt is not present for his daughter's birth because he is preoccupied with drug-related business, and he blames Jesse for making him miss the birth. Ted Beneke, Skyler's boss, takes Skyler to the hospital when she goes into labor. Skyler brings the baby on her trip to the Four Corners Monument. Holly is seen learning to walk in Season 5. Holly and her brother spend three months in the home of their Aunt Marie and Uncle Hank while their parents work to determine the state of their marriage. After her Uncle Hank's unexpected death, which causes a nasty fight between Walter and Skyler, Walter kidnaps Holly to "punish" Skyler for attempting to stab him, but later has second thoughts and leaves her at a fire station. She is later returned safely to Skyler. Holly's last appearance occurs in "Felina" where Walter, via a request that is granted by Skyler, holds and embraces her for a moment before he leaves.

==== Bogdan Wolynetz ====
Bogdan Wolynetz (played by Marius Stan) is the owner and proprietor of the car wash at which Walt is employed at the beginning of Breaking Bad. He is abrasive and rude to Walter, who finds this job degrading and tedious. After Walt is diagnosed with lung cancer in the pilot episode, he angrily lashes out at Bogdan and quits.

Bogdan reappears in the third season, when Walt and Skyler are trying to purchase the car wash in order to launder Walt's drug money. When Skyler is trying to negotiate the purchase, Bogdan brings up Walt's angry outburst and states that, if Walt wants to purchase the establishment it will cost him $20 million. When Saul suggests that Walt and Skyler could accuse Bogdan of harboring Islamist terrorists in order to force him to sell the car wash, Walt exasperatedly reveals that Bogdan is, in fact, Romanian. Eventually, Walt and Skyler are able to purchase it for $800,000 after Skyler hires Kuby to perform a fake environmental audit on the car wash.

When Bogdan hands the keys to the building over to Walter, he taunts Walter by implying that he needs his "woman" to do things for him. Walter, having been riled up by Bogdan, refuses to let him leave with his first American business dollar which had been framed and mounted in his shop. Subsequently, Walter spends that dollar in the vending machine to buy a can of soda.

==== Daniel Wormald ====
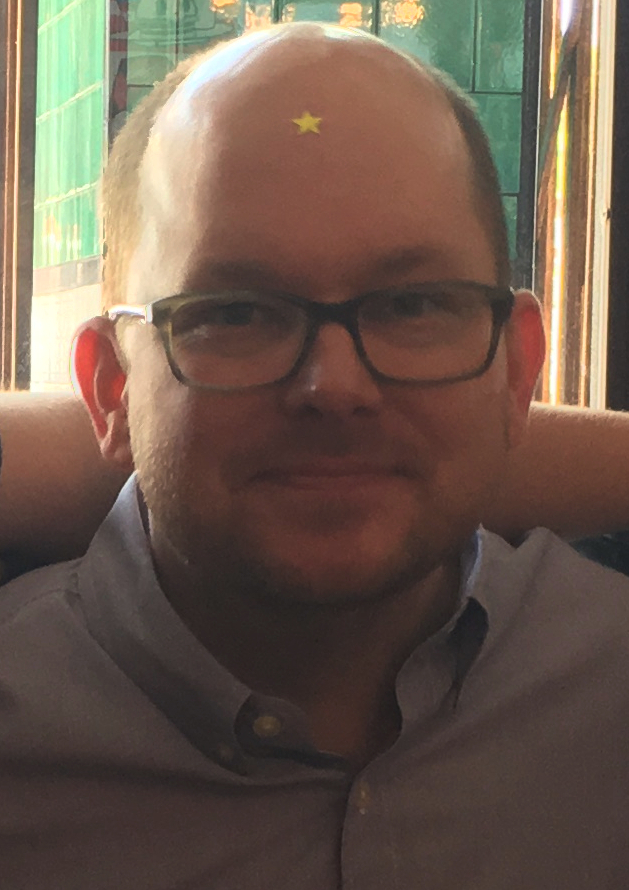
Mark Proksch

Daniel Wormald (played by Mark Proksch), who uses the alias "Pryce", is a quirky, nerdy and naive man who works for a pharmaceutical company. To earn extra money, he steals some of his company's pills to sell to Nacho and hires Mike to provide security. Knowing that Nacho is going behind the cartel's back and wants to avoid attention, Mike assures that he abides by the terms of the deal. Daniel uses the money to buy a flashy Hummer and when he arranges another deal, Mike refuses to be a part of it. Daniel still meets Nacho, but without Mike to protect him, Nacho obtains Daniel's address. Nacho later breaks into Daniel's home to steal Daniel's cash, pill stash, and a collection of baseball cards. Daniel calls the police to report the stolen cards but his awkward behavior leads the cops to find the hiding place where he kept the cash and pills. To keep Daniel from talking, Mike brokers a deal that has Nacho exchange cash and the baseball cards for Daniel's Hummer. Mike also arranges for Jimmy to represent Daniel during an interview with police. Jimmy allays their suspicions by claiming the hiding place was full of "squat cobbler" fetish videos of Daniel sitting on pies and the break-in was a lover's quarrel with the man who commissions the videos.

Nacho breaks into Daniel's home again, this time offering Daniel $20,000 if he can procure empty capsules that look like Hector's angina medication. Daniel approaches Mike for help and Mike declines. Mike changes his mind after comparing the risk an unprotected Daniel will face to the risk Mike created for his daughter-in-law and granddaughter by his recent actions against the Salamancas. Mike delivers the empty capsules to Nacho, who explains his plan to switch Hector's nitroglycerin for a placebo. Mike warns Nacho that if Hector dies, Nacho should immediately take the fakes from Hector and replace them with the real medication so that the cause of Hector's death will not be obvious.

According to the Better Call Saul Insider Podcast, the "Danny" referenced by Jimmy on his call to Francesca is intended to be Daniel, meaning Daniel owns the laser tag arena/arcade through which Jimmy tells Walt and Jesse to launder their money.

==== Margarethe Ziegler ====
Margarethe Ziegler (portrayed by Andrea Sooch) is the widow of Werner Ziegler. While Werner is constructing the meth lab for Gus Fring, he escapes to rendezvous with Margarethe, as she plans to visit him in New Mexico. After Werner inadvertently reveals construction details to Lalo, Gus realizes that Lalo could learn the whole plan and report him to cartel leaders, so he orders Werner's death. Because Werner escaped on his watch, Mike takes responsibility. After promising Werner his crew would be returned to Germany unharmed and that there will be a story about his death that satisfies his wife, Mike has Werner call his wife at the airport and convince her to return to Germany. Mike then shoots Werner, and his death is made to look like the result of a construction accident.

Lalo later uses an alias to converse with Margarethe at a bar in Germany and finds that she believes Werner died in a cave in, but saved his crew. The next day, Lalo watches Margarethe leave for work, then breaks into her home. Using a clue she provided in their conversation the night before, Lalo finds another lead that will enable him to find Werner's crew. Margarethe unexpectedly returns home to retrieve her cell phone, and her dog barks at something upstairs. Margarethe ascends the stairs to search, and Lalo prepares to kill her, but he escapes through a window without being noticed.

==== Neil Kandy ====
Neil Kandy (portrayed by Scott MacArthur) is the owner of an Albuquerque welding shop who appears in El Camino as the main antagonist. In the film, Neil and his accomplice Casey pretend to be police officers so they can enter the now-dead Todd's apartment to search for his hidden cash. They encounter Jesse, who was already there searching and prevents them from killing him by revealing that he found the money. Neil and Jesse bargain over the cash, and in order to avoid raising the suspicions of Todd's neighbors Neil agrees to let Jesse leave with a third. As they depart Todd's apartment building, Jesse recognizes Neil as the welder who built the tether that held him while he was forced to cook meth for the Brotherhood.

When Jesse realizes he does not have enough to pay for Ed Galbraith's new identity services, he secretly retrieves two pistols from his parents' house, a Colt Woodsman and an Iver Johnson Hammerless. He then drives to Neil's shop, where Neil, Casey, and three friends celebrate with escorts and cocaine. After the escorts leave, Jesse asks for the $1,800 he needs, and Neil refuses. Seeing the Woodsman in Jesse's waistband, Neil challenges Jesse to a duel for his share of the cash. Jesse agrees, and when Neil reaches for his gun, Jesse shoots Neil with the Hammerless, which was concealed in his jacket pocket. After killing Casey, Jesse collects the driver's licenses of the remaining men and lets them leave after threatening to return and kill them if they tell the police. He recovers Neil's cash and departs after setting an explosion to cover his tracks.

==== Casey ====
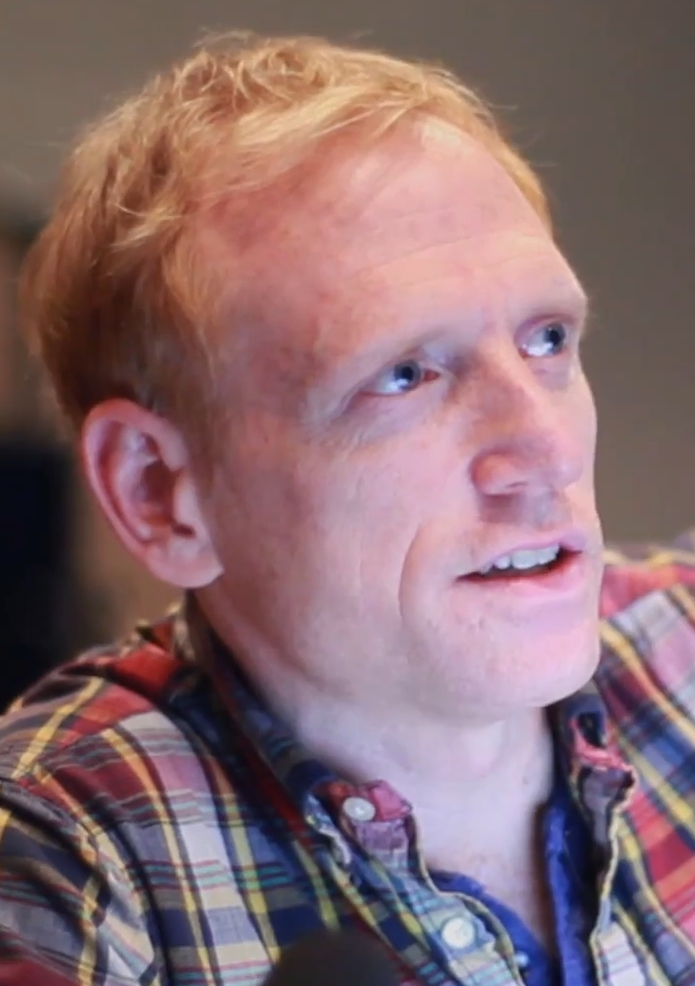
Scott Shepherd

Casey (portrayed by Scott Shepherd) is an employee at Neil Kandy's welding shop. In El Camino, after Casey and Neil confront Jesse during the search for Todd's hidden cash, Jesse saves himself by revealing that he found it. Casey then distracts Todd's busybody neighbor Lou, which enables Jesse and Neil to bargain. To avoid alarming Todd's neighbors, Neil agrees to let Jesse leave with a third. When Jesse later arrives at Neil's shop to ask for the $1,800 he needs to pay Ed Galbraith for a new identity and relocation, Casey is incensed to learn that Neil allowed Jesse to keep a third of the money and demands that he not give Jesse any more. Neil challenges Jesse to a duel for his share of the cash, during which Jesse kills Neil. Casey then fires at Jesse, but Jesse kills him with Neil's gun.

==== Lou Schanzer ====
Lou Schanzer (portrayed by Tom Bower) is a retired police officer and Todd Alquist's busybody neighbor. In El Camino, he observed Neil Kandy and Casey arrive at Todd's apartment to search for Todd's hidden money, though Neil and Casey had planned their arrival for a time when they thought he would not be home. Believing Neil and Casey to be police officers, he offers information about Todd's activities. After he leaves, Neil and Casey confront Jesse. Lou then arrives with an old note from Todd, which he believes will help Neil and Casey in their investigation. Casey pretends to be interested to divert Lou's attention, which enables Jesse and Neil to negotiate over the division of the cash, then leave Todd's apartment building.

==== Marion ====
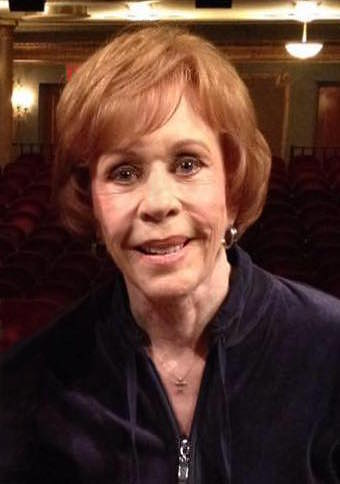
Carol Burnett

Marion (portrayed by Carol Burnett) is Jeff's elderly mother, whom Jimmy (as Gene) befriends as a ploy to gain the upper hand on Jeff. Gene puts on a kind and affable persona and lies about owning a missing dog. In addition, he claims to have never visited Albuquerque, where Marion says Jeff faced legal troubles. After Gene, Jeff and Jeff's friend Buddy secretly work together to rob a department store at the mall where Gene works, Jeff uses some of his money to buy Marion a laptop; Gene teaches her how to search on a web browser. While watching videos one night, Marion overhears Gene berating Buddy because Buddy has backed out of Gene's latest scam. Gene refuses to give up on robbing the mark, so he has Jeff drive him to the mark's home. Jeff panics when he sees a police car idle behind him and crashes his taxi, leading to his arrest. Gene asks Marion to accompany him when delivering Jeff's bail. Gene's knowledge of the legal process arouses Marion's suspicions, and she uses her computer to discover Gene's identity as Saul Goodman. Gene attempts to intimidate her into staying silent, but she uses her Life Alert button to call the authorities, forcing Gene to flee. As he runs, Marion provides the operator information on Gene's movements that aids police in locating and arresting him.
