= Gray Matter (Breaking Bad) =

- Breaking Bad episode
- Walt and Elliot have a discussion.
- Episode no.: Season 1 Episode 5
- Directed by: Tricia Brock
- Written by: Patty Lin
- Cinematography by: Rey Villalobos
- Editing by: Kelley Dixon
- Original air date: February 24, 2008
- Running time: 48 minutes

Guest appearances
- Adam Godley as Elliott Schwartz; Jessica Hecht as Gretchen Schwartz; Matt Jones as Badger Mayhew; Kyle Swimmer as Louis Corbett

Episode chronology
← Previous "Cancer Man"	Next → "Crazy Handful of Nothin'"
- Breaking Bad season 1

"Gray Matter" is the fifth episode of the first season of the American television crime drama series Breaking Bad. Written by Patty Lin and directed by Tricia Brock, it aired on AMC in the United States on February 24, 2008. The episode revolves around Walter White (Bryan Cranston) attending the birthday of his old co-worker Elliott Schwartz (Adam Godley) and facing the possibility of undergoing chemotherapy for his cancer, while Jesse Pinkman (Aaron Paul) turns back to dealing drugs.

The episode received positive reviews from critics. Series creator Vince Gilligan later identified the episode as a turning point for the series, as the episode in which Walter "breaks bad" as per the series' title by turning back to making meth despite having a more ethical alternative.

== Plot ==
Walter and Skyler White attend a birthday party for their wealthy acquaintance, Elliott Schwartz. When Elliott offers him a job and tells him that his company Gray Matter Technologies has excellent health insurance, Walt realizes that Skyler told Elliott about his cancer and declines the offer, getting upset with her.

After a failed job interview, Jesse Pinkman shows his friend Badger the RV Walt and Jesse use as a meth lab. In the desert, Jesse is frustrated that the quality of his meth is inferior to that of Walt's and throws his own product away, much to Badger's dismay. Jesse cooks a couple more batches, which he also discards. Badger and Jesse brawl over the wasted meth, and Jesse pushes Badger out of the RV before driving away, leaving Badger stranded in the desert.

Walt Jr. and two friends are waiting outside a convenience store, waiting for somebody to buy them beer. The friends run away when Walt Jr. approaches a policeman. In the police car, the officer tells him he got his "first and last warning. You're lucky you got a good dad here." and it is revealed that Hank is sitting in the drivers seat. Skyler holds an intervention for Walt, saying she does not understand why Walt is refusing treatment. Hank Schrader, Walt Jr., and Marie Schrader argue over what to do. While Skyler is worried for her husband and Walt Jr. is angered that his father refuses to take the treatment despite everything he has been through. Marie and later Hank feel Walt should have the choice to decline treatment if he wants. Walt ends the intervention by saying he does not want to spend his last months being too sick to properly enjoy life.

The next morning, Walt has a change of heart and tells Skyler he will do the treatment, and he will take care of Elliott's check. Later, Elliott's wife Gretchen calls, telling him that he has to accept the money. Walt says he appreciates the offer, but lies and says his insurance will now cover it. Walt then goes to Jesse's house and asks him if he wants to cook.

== Production ==
The episode was written by Patty Lin and directed by Tricia Brock; it aired on AMC in the United States and Canada on February 24, 2008.

== Critical reception ==
Seth Amitin of IGN gave the episode a rating of 8.9 out of 10. Donna Bowman of The A.V. Club gave the episode an "A−".

In 2019, The Ringer ranked "Gray Matter" as the 34th best out of the 62 total Breaking Bad episodes. Vulture ranked it 37th overall.
