= Crazy Handful of Nothin' =

- Breaking Bad episode
- Walt reveals that the substance he brought to Tuco is not meth.
- Episode no.: Season 1 Episode 6
- Directed by: Bronwen Hughes
- Written by: George Mastras
- Cinematography by: Rey Villalobos
- Editing by: Skip Macdonald
- Original air date: March 2, 2008
- Running time: 47 minutes

Guest appearances
- Raymond Cruz as Tuco Salamanca; Steven Michael Quezada as Steven Gomez; Carmen Serano as Carmen Molina; Charles Baker as Skinny Pete; Cesar Garcia as No Doze; Jesus Payan as Gonzo

Episode chronology
← Previous "Gray Matter"	Next → "A No-Rough-Stuff-Type Deal"
- Breaking Bad season 1

"Crazy Handful of Nothin'" is the sixth episode of the first season of the American television drama series Breaking Bad. Written by George Mastras and directed by Bronwen Hughes, it aired on AMC in the United States on March 2, 2008. The episode introduces Tuco Salamanca, played by Raymond Cruz.

== Plot ==
Upon his decision to return to the illicit drug business, Walter White and his accomplice Jesse Pinkman come to an agreement: Walt will be the cook and silent partner in their meth operation, while Jesse will sell their product on the street. Walt also demands no further bloodshed. Meanwhile, as Walt's chemotherapy continues, he tells Skyler White that Elliott Schwartz's check came and he deposited it, when in fact he is struggling to pay for the treatment and plans on using his meth profits to cover it. He starts feeling the effects of chemotherapy during class and vomits in the men's room, which Hugo Archilleya, the school janitor, cleans up after him. At a family therapy session, Skyler tells Walt that she is concerned about his missing hours, but he says that he just likes to be alone sometimes and take walks.

While cooking meth, Jesse notices a radiotherapy burn on Walt's chest and realizes he is trying to financially provide for his family before he dies of lung cancer; Walt confirms his suspicions. Jesse finishes their current batch and spends all night selling it, bringing Walt his share of $1,300, far less than he expected. Walt realises they need a distributor; after Krazy-8's death, drug lord Tuco Salamanca has taken over his territory. Jesse obtains a meeting with Tuco after getting his friend Skinny Pete, who served time in prison with Tuco, to vouch for him. Though Tuco is willing to pay $35,000 for a pound of meth, he insists on paying only after his dealers have completed the sales. When Jesse refuses and attempts to take back the drugs, Tuco severely beats him.

Meanwhile, Hank Schrader traces the gas mask found in the desert to Walt's high school. Hank and Walt take inventory of the chemistry lab to find other equipment missing, leading Hank to suspect that a student obtained a key to the lab storage room. Later, Hank arrests Hugo, who would have had the keys and had a criminal record for drug possession. Walt feels guilty letting Hugo take the blame and tries to contact Jesse, only to learn about his hospitalization. He visits Jesse and learns what happened with Tuco.

Now starting to lose his hair from the chemo, Walt decides to shave his head. Afterward, he arranges for a meeting with Tuco. He introduces himself under the alias Heisenberg, and demands $50,000 from Tuco—$35,000 for the meth he took from Jesse, and $15,000 for beating Jesse. Tuco laughs at Walt for bringing him another bag of meth after his previous batch was stolen, but Walt reveals that the substance he brought is not meth but fulminated mercury. Walt then throws a piece against the ground, causing an explosion that blows out the windows and knocks everyone off their feet. He threatens to throw the whole bag before an incredulous Tuco agrees to the payment. Before leaving, Walt makes a deal with Tuco, promising to give him two pounds of meth a week as long as Tuco pays him upfront. Once back in his car with the money, Walt experiences an intense rush from what he has just done.

== Production ==
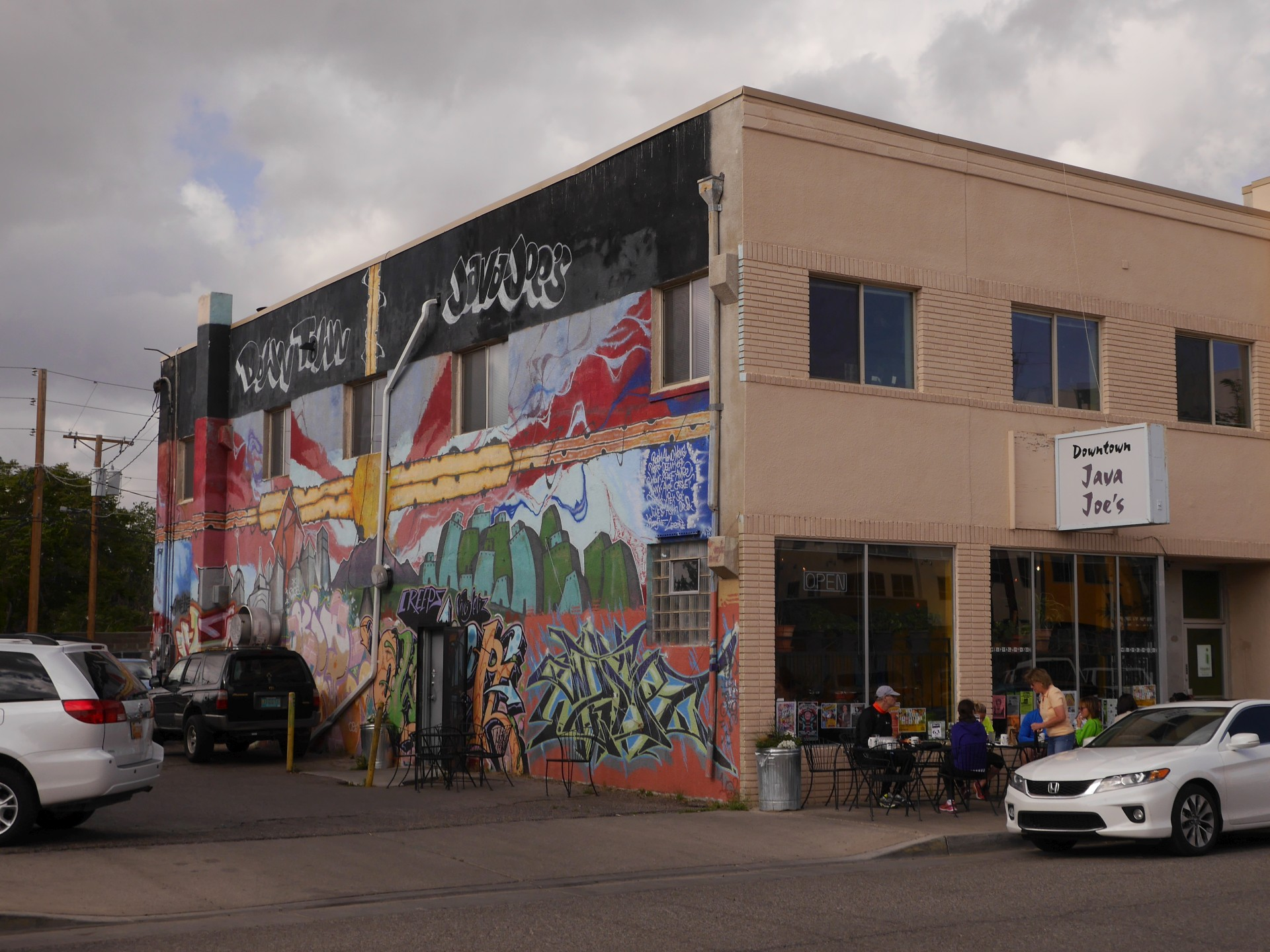
The cafe Java Joe's was used as the location for Tuco's headquarters.

The episode was written by George Mastras and directed by Bronwen Hughes; it aired on AMC in the United States and Canada on March 2, 2008.

== Title meaning ==
The episode title is a part of a line from the 1967 film Cool Hand Luke. A "handful of nothing" means that one lacks valuable cards in one's poker hand and must bluff to win. This is also alluded to in a scene where Walter wins a family poker game by bluffing.

== Critical reception ==
Seth Amitin of IGN gave the episode a rating of 9.8 out of 10 commenting: "There is a certain truism about television and this is it: start an episode with an explosion and we like you. Start it off with an explosion and someone walking away with a bag full of cash and no explanation, we love you. Build up five episodes that were leading to a conclusion as drastic as this, and we'll worship the ground you walk on. This, friends, was a fantastic episode."

In 2019, The Ringer ranked "Crazy Handful of Nothin'" as the 32nd best out of the 62 total Breaking Bad episodes. Vulture ranked it 12th overall.
