= Cancer Man (Breaking Bad) =

- Breaking Bad episode
- Walt walks away after setting Ken's car ablaze.
- Episode no.: Season 1 Episode 4
- Directed by: Jim McKay
- Written by: Vince Gilligan
- Cinematography by: Rey Villalobos
- Editing by: Lynne Willingham
- Original air date: February 17, 2008
- Running time: 48 minutes

Guest appearances
- Tess Harper as Diane Pinkman; Steven Michael Quezada as Steven Gomez; Michael Bofshever as Adam Pinkman; Kyle Bornheimer as Ken; Ben Petry as Jake Pinkman; David House as Dr. Delcavoli; Charles Baker as Skinny Pete; Rodney Rush as Combo Ortega

Episode chronology
← Previous "...And the Bag's in the River"	Next → "Gray Matter"
- Breaking Bad season 1

"Cancer Man" is the fourth episode of the first season of the American television drama series Breaking Bad. Written by Vince Gilligan and directed by Jim McKay, it aired on AMC in the United States on February 17, 2008.

== Plot ==
Hank Schrader and his Drug Enforcement Administration (DEA) team have a meeting over the disappearances of Emilio Koyama and Krazy-8, the latter of whom is revealed to have been their informant. Hank also reports on their discovery of 99.1% pure methamphetamine. Although the DEA had no leads, Hank believes the product is good enough to make whoever produced it Albuquerque's new meth kingpin. Meanwhile, Walt tells Hank, Marie Schrader, and Walt Jr. about his cancer; Skyler White has already been told. Jesse Pinkman smokes Walt's meth with two friends, Skinny Pete and Combo, and flees his house the next morning when he hallucinates that two Mormon missionaries at his door are armed bikers.

Skyler makes an appointment with one of the top oncologists in the country, Dr. Delcavoli, despite the family being unable to afford his service. Walt says he will take the money out of his pension, but secretly uses some of the money taken from Krazy-8 in the desert, which he keeps hidden in an air-conditioning duct at his house. Walt Jr. berates his father for his attitude towards his cancer. When Walt goes to his credit union to put the cash in a cashier's check, his parking spot is stolen by an obnoxious man named Ken. Inside, Ken annoys Walt further with his loud and socially inappropriate cell phone conversation.

Jesse, having fled his house, ends up in the backyard of his affluent parents' house, and falls asleep in his childhood bedroom. He attempts to bond with his overachieving younger brother, Jake. That night, Jesse gets a call from one of the friends who smoked Walt's meth, who says that he knows a lot of wealthy people looking to score drugs and are willing to pay top dollar for the high-quality meth he cooked. The next day, Jesse visits Walt at the White residence to discuss their dealings, but Walt angrily rebuffs him and kicks him out. Jesse gives Walt his half of the meth profit ($4,000 in cash) before leaving. The oncologist informs Walt that the cancer has spread to his lymph nodes, but there is a chance it is still treatable with chemotherapy.

At the Pinkman residence, a housekeeper finds a joint in Jesse's room and, believing the joint belongs to him, Jesse's parents banish him from the house. The joint is revealed to belong to Jake, who thanks Jesse for taking the blame for him. While Jesse is waiting for a taxi outside the house, Jake asks for his joint back, to which Jesse responds by destroying it, saying it was of poor quality anyway.

At home, Walt expresses his doubts about the chemotherapy since it will cost $90,000 and if he still dies, he will leave his family with all the debt. Walt Jr. angrily tells Walt he should just die already if he is going to give up so easily. Walt suffers a coughing attack while driving, coughing up blood. As he pulls into a gas station, he notices Ken pulling up as well. When Ken leaves his car unattended, Walt takes a squeegee and shorts the car battery with it. The battery catches fire and explodes as Walt walks back to his car.

== Production ==
The episode was written by Vince Gilligan and directed by Jim McKay; it aired on AMC in the United States and Canada on February 17, 2008.

The title "Cancer Man" is a reference to The X-Files character Cigarette Smoking Man, whom Mulder first called Cancer Man. Vince Gilligan was previously a writer and producer for that series.

== Critical reception ==
Seth Amitin of IGN gave the episode a rating of 8.6 out of 10, commenting: "This seemed like an ordinary episode, but a lot of subversive plot and character development happened and if you've been watching the previous episodes, you probably know why this episode was so good. There's a lot to extrapolate." Donna Bowman of The A.V. Club gave the episode a "B−", saying: "This episode doesn't have the wow factor that the series has had so far – it's about moving the pieces into place for long-term strategy."

In 2019 The Ringer ranked "Cancer Man" 43rd out of the 62 total Breaking Bad episodes. Vulture ranked it 56th overall.
