= ...And the Bag's in the River =

- Breaking Bad episode
- Walt converses with the captive Krazy-8 in Jesse's basement.
- Episode no.: Season 1 Episode 3
- Directed by: Adam Bernstein
- Written by: Vince Gilligan
- Cinematography by: Rey Villalobos
- Editing by: Kelley Dixon
- Original air date: February 10, 2008
- Running time: 48 minutes

Guest appearances
- Max Arciniega as Krazy-8; Jessica Hecht as Gretchen Schwartz; Steven Michael Quezada as Steven Gomez; Carmen Serano as Carmen Molina; Julia Minesci as Wendy

Episode chronology
← Previous "Cat's in the Bag..."	Next → "Cancer Man"
- Breaking Bad season 1

"...And the Bag's in the River" is the third episode of the first season of the American television drama series Breaking Bad. Written by Vince Gilligan and directed by Adam Bernstein, it aired on AMC in the United States on February 10, 2008.

== Plot ==
Walt and Jesse clean up the bloody remains of Emilio while Krazy-8 remains locked up in the basement. While talking with Walt, Krazy-8 reveals that Jesse told him and Emilio about Walt's personal life. Walt then confronts Jesse, while the latter is smoking meth. Jesse angrily berates Walt for not performing his agreed upon task before driving away in a rage. Meanwhile, Skyler tells Marie that she is working on a new short story with a stoner character in it, and she asks her about marijuana. Marie assumes that Skyler thinks Walt Jr. is smoking pot, but Skyler insists that she was just talking about her story. Marie asks Hank to scare Walt Jr. straight, leading him to bring Walt Jr. to a motel to show how meth has corroded the teeth of a prostitute.

Still at Jesse's house, Walt phones Skyler to apologize for still being out late, falsely claiming that he is working over at the car wash. Skyler informs Walt that she knows he quit his job there two weeks previously and angrily tells him to not come home. Walt weighs the pros and cons of killing Krazy-8. While delivering food to him, Walt suffers a violent coughing fit and collapses on the basement floor, the plate holding the food shattering on the concrete floor. After he regains consciousness, Walt sadly reveals to Krazy-8 that he has lung cancer. Feeling a bond with Krazy-8 from their conversation, Walt decides to let him go. While retrieving the key to the bike lock which is holding Krazy-8 captive, Walt realizes that there is a large shard missing from the broken plate, hinting that Krazy-8 obtained it while Walt was unconscious and plans to use it as a weapon. Walt tearfully confronts him, only for Krazy-8 to attack him with the broken piece of plate, forcing Walt to garrote him to death with the bike lock. Krazy-8 manages to stab him in the leg with the shard of plate during the struggle. Walt returns home to find Skyler sitting on the bed crying. He says he has something to tell her.

Meanwhile, Hank and several DEA agents discover the cook site in the desert along with Krazy-8's car. Inside the car, they find the small bag of crystal meth cooked by Walt. The family of Native Americans shares the lab mask the young girl found in the previous episode.

== Production ==
The episode was written by Vince Gilligan, and directed by Adam Bernstein; it aired on AMC in the United States and Canada on February 10, 2008.

The episode title is a part of a line from the 1957 film Sweet Smell of Success, in which a character reports that he resolved an issue. It means that Walt kills Krazy-8.

J.J. Hunsecker: "That means you've got a plan. Can you deliver?"
Sidney Falco: "Tonight, before you go to bed. The cat's in the bag and the bag's in the river."

== Critical reception ==
Seth Amitin of IGN gave the episode a rating of 8.9 out of 10 commenting: "If you put every episode of every TV show in existence and rolled it up into one giant ball, we doubt you'd come out with anything as intense as that one minute of television where Walt killed Crazy-8 [sic]." Donna Bowman of The A.V. Club gave the episode an "A−", saying: "All the heavy stuff I loved so much and described above -- yet this was also an episode full of hilarious lines."

In 2019, The Ringer ranked "...And the Bag's in the River" as the 10th best out of the 62 total Breaking Bad episodes. Vulture ranked it 22nd overall.
