= Sweet Smell of Success =

1957 film by Alexander Mackendrick

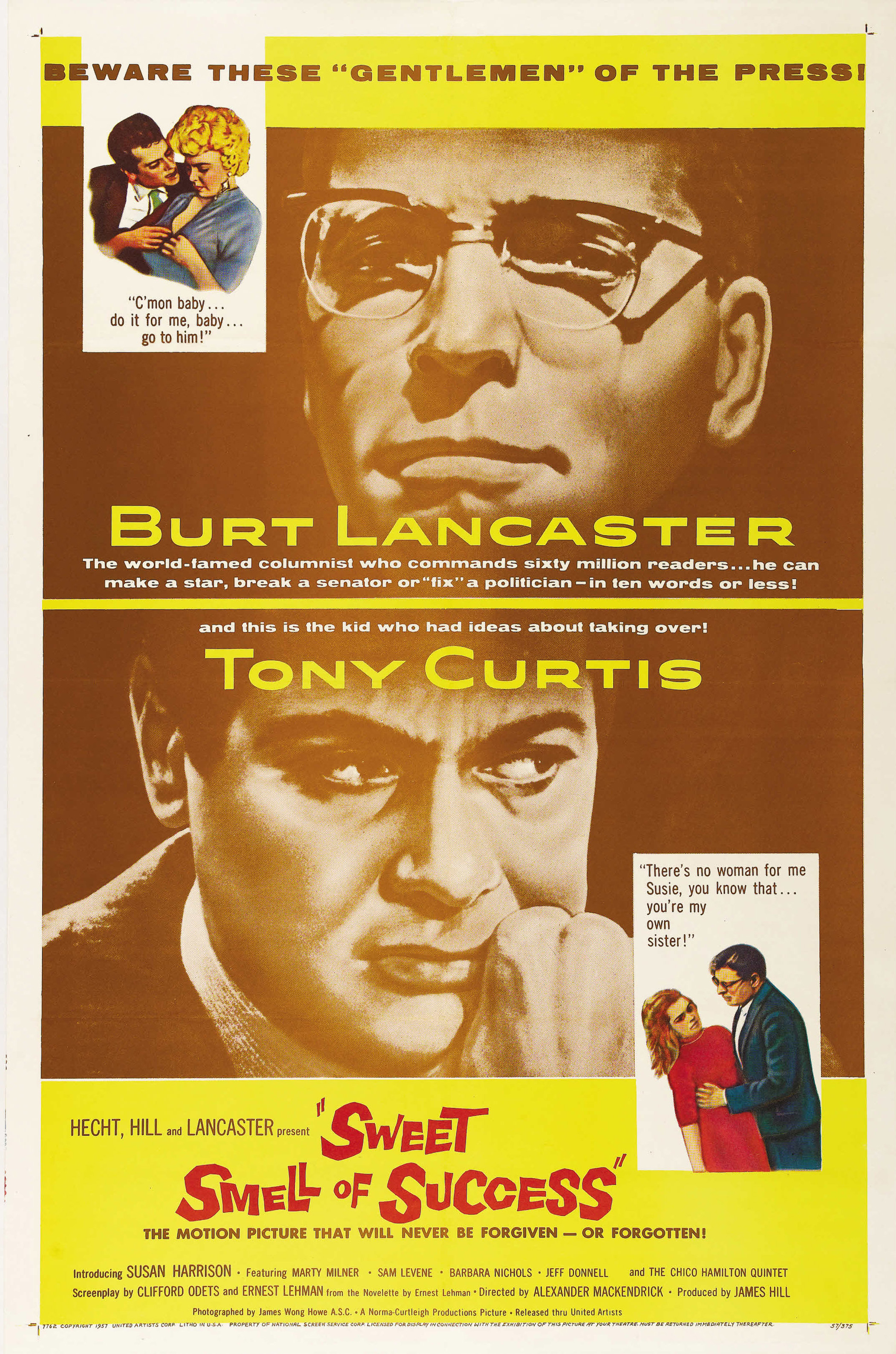
- Theatrical release poster
- Directed by: Alexander Mackendrick
- Screenplay by: Clifford Odets; Ernest Lehman
- Based on: Tell Me About It Tomorrow! (1950 novelette) by Ernest Lehman
- Produced by: James Hill
- Starring: Burt Lancaster; Tony Curtis; Susan Harrison; Martin Milner; Sam Levene; Barbara Nichols; Jeff Donnell; Chico Hamilton
- Cinematography: James Wong Howe
- Edited by: Alan Crosland Jr.
- Music by: Elmer Bernstein
- Production companies: Hecht-Hill-Lancaster Productions; Norma Productions; Curtleigh Productions
- Distributed by: United Artists
- Release dates: June 27, 1957 (New York City); July 4, 1957 (U.S.)
- Running time: 96 minutes
- Country: United States
- Language: English
- Budget: $3.4 million or $2 million
- Box office: $2.25 million (US)

Sweet Smell of Success is a 1957 American satirical drama film noir directed by Alexander Mackendrick, adapted by Clifford Odets and Ernest Lehman from the latter's 1950 novelette Tell Me About It Tomorrow!. It stars Burt Lancaster, Tony Curtis, Susan Harrison, and Martin Milner. The film tells the story of powerful and sleazy newspaper columnist J.J. Hunsecker (portrayed by Lancaster and based on Walter Winchell) who uses his connections to ruin his sister's relationship with a man he deems unworthy of her.

The shadowy cinematography filmed on location in New York City was shot by James Wong Howe. The picture was produced by James Hill of Hecht-Hill-Lancaster Productions and released by United Artists. The supporting cast features Sam Levene, Barbara Nichols, Joe Frisco, Edith Atwater, David White, and Emile Meyer. The musical score was arranged and conducted by Elmer Bernstein and the film also features jazz performances by the Chico Hamilton Quintet. Mary Grant designed the costumes.

Despite a poorly received preview screening, Sweet Smell of Success has greatly improved in stature over the years. It grew to become highly acclaimed by film critics, particularly for its cinematography and screenplay. In 1993, the film was selected for preservation in the United States National Film Registry by the Library of Congress as being "culturally, historically, or aesthetically significant."

== Plot ==
Up-and-coming Manhattan press agent Sidney Falco scans the New York Globe for the column of J.J. Hunsecker, a media kingpin whose journalism and radio show dominate the entertainment world. For the fifth day, J.J. has not publicized any of Sidney's clients, as he is protective of his 19-year-old sister Susan and has asked Sidney to end her affair with jazz guitarist Steve Dallas. Sidney has been unsuccessful.

Steve is performing at the Elysian Room with his group as Sidney argues with his uncle Frank D’Angelo (who is Steve's manager), who has promised Steve and Susan will part. Sidney learns from Rita, cigarette girl, that Susan is waiting for Steve behind the club, he interrupts them. Steve accuses him of "scratching for information like a dog." Rita asks Sidney to help her keep her job, at risk because she refused to sleep with J.J.’s competitor, Leo Bartha. Sidney secures a date with Rita. Questioned by Susan, he reassures her that J.J. is a close friend. J.J. greets his informer Harry Kello, a corrupt NYPD lieutenant indebted to J.J. for saving his job after Kello beat a suspect. J.J. gives Sidney an ultimatum to destroy Steve and Susan's relationship.

Sidney attempts to blackmail Leo, threatening to expose his affair with Rita unless Leo prints a gossip item that Steve is a Communist who smokes cannabis. Leo chooses his journalistic integrity, which his wife Loretta praises as his first decent act in years. Sidney bribes another columnist, Otis Elwell, with the promise of a sexual favor from an "available" woman. Rita initially objects, but ultimately assents to Sidney's plan in order to stay employed. The smear appears in Otis's column and the quintet is fired.

As planned, J.J. gets Steve rehired with a phone call in front of Susan, but Steve rebukes him for his malignant influence on society. Susan breaks up with Steve to save him from J.J.'s vengeance. J.J. orders Sidney to plant marijuana on Steve; Sidney balks, saying he can accept a dog collar but not a noose. He acquiesces when J.J. offers to let Sidney write his column for three months while he vacations with Susan.

Sidney slips marijuana into Steve's coat pocket. Kello assaults Steve, who is hospitalized. Sidney celebrates, but is summoned to J.J.'s penthouse where Susan is about to commit suicide by jumping from the balcony. He takes her to her bedroom to rest. Arriving to find the two holding each other, J.J. scolds him. Realizing that Susan set him up, Sidney reveals that J.J. conspired to frame Steve. He leaves, vowing to reveal the truth and telling J.J. that Susan is lost to him. J.J. calls to tell Kello that Steve is innocent, ordering Sidney be arrested for planting evidence. Kello ambushes Sidney and beats him.

J.J. begs Susan to stay as she packs; she says death is preferable to living with him. J.J. watches from the balcony as she strides into the coming dawn.

== Cast ==
- Burt Lancaster as J. J. Hunsecker
- Tony Curtis as Sidney Falco
- Susan Harrison as Susan Hunsecker
- Martin Milner as Steve Dallas (billed as "Marty Milner")
- Sam Levene as Frank D'Angelo
- Barbara Nichols as Rita
- Jeff Donnell as Sally
- Joe Frisco as Herbie Temple
- Emile Meyer as Lt. Harry Kello
- Edith Atwater as Mary
- David White as Otis Elwell (uncredited)
- Lawrence Dobkin as Leo Bartha (uncredited)
- Lurene Tuttle as Loretta Bartha (uncredited)
- Lewis Charles as Al Evans, Herbie's manager (uncredited)
- William Forrest as Senator Harvey Walker (uncredited)
- Jay Adler as Manny Davis (uncredited)
- Autumn Russell as Linda James (uncredited)
- Queenie Smith as Mildred Tam (uncredited)
- Joseph Leon as Joe Robard (uncredited)
- Bob Carson as Leo the headwaiter (uncredited)
- Chico Hamilton and his Quintet as themselves, including Fred Katz (as the cellist) and Paul Horn (as the flautist)

== Production ==
Faced with potential unemployment from the sale of Ealing Studios to the BBC in 1954, director Alexander Mackendrick began entertaining offers from Hollywood. He rejected potential contracts from Cary Grant and David Selznick and signed with independent production company Hecht-Hill-Lancaster, enticed by their offer to adapt George Bernard Shaw’s play The Devil's Disciple. After the project collapsed during pre-production, Mackendrick asked to be released from his commitment. Harold Hecht refused and asked him to start work on another project – adapting Ernest Lehman's novellette Sweet Smell of Success into a film.

Lehman's story had originally appeared in the April 1950 issue of Cosmopolitan, renamed "Tell Me About It Tomorrow!" because the editor of the magazine did not want the word "smell" in the publication. It was based on his own experiences working as an assistant to Irving Hoffman, a New York press agent and columnist for The Hollywood Reporter. Hoffman subsequently did not speak to Lehman for a year and a half. Hoffman then wrote a column for The Hollywood Reporter speculating that Lehman would make a good screenwriter, and within a week Paramount called Lehman, inviting him to Los Angeles for talks. Lehman forged a screenwriting career in Hollywood, writing Executive Suite, Sabrina, North by Northwest, The Sound of Music, West Side Story, The King and I, and Who's Afraid of Virginia Woolf?.

=== Pre-production ===
By the time Hecht-Hill-Lancaster acquired Success, Lehman was in position to adapt his novelette, produce and direct the film. After scouting locations, Lehman was told by Hecht that distributor United Artists was having second thoughts about going with a first-time director, so Hecht offered the film to Mackendrick. Initially, the director had reservations about trying to film such a dialogue-heavy screenplay, so he and Lehman worked on it for weeks to make it more cinematic. As the script neared completion, Lehman became ill and had to resign from the picture. James Hill took over and offered Paddy Chayefsky as Lehman's replacement. Mackendrick suggested Clifford Odets, the playwright whose reputation as a left-wing hero had been tarnished after he named names before the House Un-American Activities Committee.

Mackendrick assumed that Odets would need only two or three weeks to polish the script but he took four months. "We started shooting with no final script at all, while Clifford reconstructed the thing from stem to stern". The plot was largely intact but in Mackendrick's biography he is quoted from Notes on Sweet Smell of Success: "What Clifford did, in effect, was dismantle the structure of every single sequence in order to rebuild situations and relationships that were much more complex, had much greater tension and more dramatic energy". This process took time and the start date for the production could not be delayed. Odets had to accompany the production to Manhattan and continued rewriting while they shot there. Returning to the city that had shunned him for going to Hollywood made Odets very neurotic and obsessed with all kinds of rituals as he worked at a furious pace, with pages often going straight from his typewriter to being shot the same day. Mackendrick said, "So we cut the script there on the floor, with the actors, just cutting down lines, making them more spare – what Clifford would have done himself, really, had there been time".

Tony Curtis had to fight for the role of Sidney Falco because Universal, his studio, was worried that it would ruin his career. Tired of doing pretty-boy roles and wanting to prove that he could act, Curtis got his way. Orson Welles was originally considered for the role of J. J. Hunsecker. Mackendrick wanted to cast Hume Cronyn because he felt that Cronyn closely resembled Walter Winchell, the basis for the Hunsecker character in the novelette. Lehman made the distinction in an interview that Winchell was the inspiration for the version of the character in the novelette, and that this differs from the character in the film version. United Artists wanted Burt Lancaster in the role because of his box office appeal and his successful pairing with Curtis on Trapeze. Robert Vaughn was signed to a contract with Lancaster's film company and was to have played the Steve Dallas role but was drafted into the Army before he could begin the film. Ernest Borgnine, contracted to Hecht-Hill-Lancaster since Marty (1955) was offered a role but turned it down as it was only seven pages long in the script. His refusal led him to be put on suspension from Hecht-Hill-Lancaster. Susan Harrison was cast and then did five screen tests with potential love-interests before Martin Milner was cast opposite her.

Hecht-Hill-Lancaster allowed Mackendrick to familiarize himself with New York City before shooting the movie. In Notes on Sweet Smell of Success, Mackendrick said, "One of the characteristic aspects of New York, particularly of the area between 42nd Street and 57th Street, is the neurotic energy of the crowded sidewalks. This was, I argued, essential to the story of characters driven by the uglier aspects of ambition and greed". He took photographs of the city from several fixed points and taped the pictures into a series of panoramas that he stuck on a wall and studied once he got back to Hollywood. The cellist Fred Katz and drummer Chico Hamilton, who briefly appear in the film as themselves, wrote a score for the movie, which was ultimately rejected in favor of one by Elmer Bernstein.

=== Principal photography ===
Mackendrick shot the film in late 1956, and was scared the entire time because Hecht-Hill-Lancaster had a reputation for firing their directors for any or even no reason at all. The filmmaker was used to extensive rehearsals before a scene was shot and often found himself shooting a script page one or two hours after Odets had written it. Susan Harrison went on to say: "Everyone was always there. There were constant, daily around-the-table discussions, revisions, changes. Everyone was welcome to their input. It was the most democratic... and even I was invited and even asked what I thought... it was a good way to work. I'd never seen it done that way."

Lancaster's presence proved to be intimidating for numerous individuals involved with the production; at one point, Lehman had been approached to direct the film, but declined due to his fear of Lancaster, although Hecht maintained that Lehman had never been offered the chance to direct. Mackendrick and composer Elmer Bernstein both found Lancaster intimidating, with Bernstein later recalling, "Burt was really scary. He was a dangerous guy. He had a short fuse". Mackendrick decided to use Lancaster's volatility to work for the character of J.J., asking that Lancaster wear his own browline glasses, which Mackendrick felt gave him the presence of "a scholarly brute". Mackendrick smeared a thin layer of vaseline on the lenses, preventing Lancaster from focusing his eyes and giving him a perpetually blank gaze. Assisted by cinematographer James Wong Howe, Mackendrick intentionally filmed scenes with J.J. from a low angle using a wide-angle lens and with overhead lighting directly above Lancaster, so that the spectacle frames cast shadows on his face.

Shooting on location in New York City also added to Mackendrick's anxieties. Exteriors were shot in the busiest, noisiest areas with crowds of young Tony Curtis fans occasionally breaking through police barriers. Mackendrick remembered, "We started shooting in Times Square at rush hour, and we had high-powered actors and a camera crane and police help and all the rest of it, but we didn't have any script. We knew where we were going vaguely, but that's all".

== Reaction ==
A preview screening of Sweet Smell of Success was poorly received, as Tony Curtis fans were expecting him to play one of his typical nice guy roles and instead were presented with the scheming Sidney Falco. Mackendrick remembered seeing audience members "curling up, crossing their arms and legs, recoiling from the screen in disgust". Burt Lancaster's fans were not thrilled with their idol either, "finding the film too static and talky".

The film was a box-office failure, and Hecht blamed his producing partner Hill. "The night of the preview, Harold said to me, 'You know you've wrecked our company? We're going to lose over a million dollars on this picture,'" Hill recalled. According to Lehman, Lancaster blamed him, claiming that: "Burt threatened me at a party after the preview. He said, 'You didn't have to leave – you could have made this a much better picture. I ought to beat you up.' I said, 'Go ahead – I could use the money.'"

Variety estimated the film lost at least $400,000 on its initial run.

Although he and Hecht would fire Mackendrick from The Devil's Disciple for the same painstaking (and costly) approach, Lancaster was quoted as saying that he felt Mackendrick had done a fantastic job for Sweet Smell of Success and that it was not his fault the film lost money. He also believed that Curtis should have gotten an Oscar for his role as Falco.

Sweet Smell of Success premiered in New York at Loew's State in Times Square on June 27, 1957. Critical reaction was much more favorable. Time magazine said the movie was "raised to considerable dramatic heights by intense acting, taut direction ... superb camera work ... and, above all, by its whiplash dialogue". Time and the New York Herald included the film on their ten-best lists for films released in 1957. The film's critical reputation increased in subsequent decades. David Denby in New York magazine later called it "the most acrid, and the best" of all New York movies because it captured, "better than any film I know the atmosphere of Times Square and big-city journalism".

Sweet Smell of Success holds a 98% rating based on 61 reviews at Rotten Tomatoes; the critical consensus explains, "Sweet Smell of Success boasts a top-notch cast, sharp direction, atmospheric cinematography, and an appropriately jazzy score, making it one of the best noir crime thrillers ever made." At Metacritic it has a weighted average score rating of 100 out of 100 based on 5 reviews. According to The Guardian, British press assessed it a perfect 10/10 based on reviews from multiple British newspapers. A. O. Scott wrote in March 2002 for The New York Times: "Courtesy of Ernest Lehman and Clifford Odets, a high-toned street vernacular that no real New Yorker has ever spoken but that every real New Yorker wishes he could". Andrew Sarris in the New York Observer, again in 2002, wrote, "the main incentive to see this movie is its witty, pungent and idiomatic dialogue, such as you never hear on the screen anymore in this age of special-effects illiteracy". Pauline Kael wrote: " ... the film is a slice of perversity—a study of dollar and power worship ... Alexander Mackendrick has a crisp film-noir style: the production is shaped by a zest for the corrupt milieu, the pulsating big-city life (what used to be called 'the symphony of a city')—the streets, the nightclubs, the cynical types, the noise and desperation. His temperament enables us to respond to the vitality in this decadence." Eddie Muller wrote that the film "emerged from the cutting room a perverse, unpleasant, brilliant, and profound film. Arguably the best work of everyone involved."

=== Legacy ===
In 1993, the year Mackendrick died, the film was selected for preservation in the United States National Film Registry by the Library of Congress as being "culturally, historically, or aesthetically significant".

In 2002, a a musical stage version was created by Marvin Hamlisch, Craig Carnelia and John Guare. It was not considered a critical or commercial success.

In its "100 Years...100 Heroes and Villains" list, the American Film Institute (AFI) named J. J. Hunsecker number 35 of the top 50 movie villains of all time in 2003. In 2006, Writers Guild of America West ranked its screenplay 34th in WGA’s list of 101 Greatest Screenplays.

Filmmaker Barry Levinson paid tribute to Sweet Smell of Success in his 1982 film Diner . One character quotes only lines from the film.

The film has been cited as Breaking Bad creator Vince Gilligan's favorite movie. The titles of the episodes "Cat's in the Bag..." and "...And the Bag's in the River", both from the first season of the show, are quotes from the film.

Publication	Country	Accolade	Year	Rank
Sight and Sound	UK	Sight & Sound 2012 critics top 250 films	2012	171
Empire	UK	The 500 Greatest Movies of All Time	2008	314
The New York Times	US	The Best 1000 Movies Ever Made	2004	*
Films101.com	US	The Best Movies of All Time (10,059 Most Notable)	2013	124
Total Film	US	100 Greatest Movies of All Time	2010	*
Time	US	All-TIME 100 Movies	2005	*
Entertainment Weekly	US	100 Greatest Movies of All Time	1999	49
Entertainment Weekly	US	100 Greatest Movies of All Time (Second Edition)	2013	100

(*) designates unordered lists.

=== American Film Institute recognition ===
100 Years... 100 Heroes and Villains -- #35 Villain (J.J. Hunsecker)

== Home media ==
Sweet Smell of Success was released on DVD (Region 1) and Blu-ray (Region A) as part of The Criterion Collection in February 2011. The release includes new audio commentary featuring film scholar James Naremore, Mackendrick: The Man Who Walked Away, a 1986 documentary produced by Scottish Television featuring interviews with director Alexander Mackendrick, actor Burt Lancaster, producer James Hill, and others. James Wong Howe: Cinematographer, a 1973 documentary about the film's director of photography, featuring lighting tutorials with Howe, a new video interview with film critic and historian Neal Gabler (Winchell: Gossip, Power and the Culture of Celebrity) about legendary columnist Walter Winchell, inspiration for the character J. J. Hunsecker, and a new video interview with filmmaker James Mangold about Mackendrick, his instructor and mentor. There is also a booklet featuring an essay by critic Gary Giddins, notes about the film and two short stories introducing its characters by screenwriter Ernest Lehman, and an excerpt about Clifford Odets from Mackendrick's book On Film-making, introduced by the book's editor, Paul Cronin.

== See also ==
- List of American films of 1957
