= Cat's in the Bag... =

- Breaking Bad episode
- Jesse Pinkman dissolves the corpse of Emilio Koyama with hydrofluoric acid.
- Episode no.: Season 1 Episode 2
- Directed by: Adam Bernstein
- Written by: Vince Gilligan
- Cinematography by: Rey Villalobos
- Editing by: Lynne Willingham
- Original air date: January 27, 2008
- Running time: 48 minutes

Guest appearances
- Max Arciniega as Krazy-8; John Koyama as Emilio Koyama

Episode chronology
← Previous "Pilot"	Next → "...And the Bag's in the River"
- Breaking Bad season 1

"Cat's in the Bag..." is the second episode of the first season of the American television drama series Breaking Bad. Written by Vince Gilligan and directed by Adam Bernstein, it aired on AMC in the United States on January 27, 2008.

== Plot ==
Walt and Jesse return the RV to Jesse's house, which was previously owned by Jesse's late aunt. When they open the RV to remove the two bodies inside, they notice that Krazy-8 is still alive and breathing, despite having inhaled the toxic phosphine gas. The next day, Walt is driving to Jesse's house and notices a bedraggled Krazy-8 staggering down the street. Walt tries to get Krazy-8's attention, but Krazy-8 recognizes Walt and attempts to flee only to run into a tree and collapse. Walt loads the unconscious Krazy-8 into his car's trunk and takes him to Jesse's house where he and Jesse restrain Krazy-8 to a pole in Jesse's basement using a bike lock. Walt suggests that they dispose of Emilio's corpse by dissolving it in hydrofluoric acid. Realizing they must also kill Krazy-8, Walt and Jesse toss a coin to decide who will perform which task. Jesse wins and chooses to dispose of the corpse, leaving Walt to kill Krazy-8.

Walt instructs Jesse to buy a bin made from polyethylene in which the corpse can be properly dissolved, but Jesse cannot find a bin big enough to accommodate it. Walt seemingly decides on asphyxiating Krazy-8 with a plastic bag but is unable to go through with the act. He instead gives Krazy-8 food, water, a bucket, hand sanitizer and toilet paper out of guilt. When Jesse returns home and asks if Krazy-8 is dead, Walt promises to perform his agreed upon task the following day. Meanwhile, Skyler begins to suspect that Walt is hiding something due to his recent strange behavior. After Jesse makes a call to Walt's home phone, Skyler traces his phone number online and discovers his social media website. When she questions Walt as to who he is, he claims that Jesse sells him marijuana. Skyler finds his address and confronts Jesse while he is moving Emilio's body, warning him that her brother-in-law is a DEA agent, but leaves without noticing the corpse.

Jesse, having decided against following Walt's instructions, decides to dissolve Emilio's corpse in the upstairs bathtub. However, the hydrofluoric acid dissolves the ceramic and metal bathtub along with the body. This causes the ceiling beneath it to collapse, spilling Emilio's liquefied remains onto the hallway below. Exasperated, Walt tells Jesse that hydrofluoric acid will dissolve many things but not polyethylene. Meanwhile, two Native American children playing in the desert find Walt's gas mask from the previous meth cook.

== Production ==
The episode was written by Vince Gilligan and directed by Adam Bernstein. It aired on AMC in the United States and Canada on January 27, 2008.

This episode was originally supposed to be the death of Domingo Gallardo "Krazy-8" Molina along with his cousin, but the producers loved the performance of Arciniega so much that they begged Gilligan to let him stay longer.

== Title meaning ==
The episode title is a part of a line from the 1957 film Sweet Smell of Success, in which a character reports that he resolved an issue:

J.J. Hunsecker: That means you've got a plan. Can you deliver?
Sidney Falco: Tonight, before you go to bed. The cat's in the bag and the bag's in the river.

== Critical reception ==
Seth Amitin of IGN gave the episode a rating of 9.6 out of 10, commenting: "It's strange, but there's a great chemistry between these three characters, like they're puzzle pieces and their jagged edges aren't even close to matching, but they fit somehow." Donna Bowman of The A.V. Club gave the episode an "A−", saying: "At the end of the powerhouse premiere last week, I thought: Well, it's all downhill from here... I found it hard to imagine that such an episode could maintain the premiere's edge-of-psychosis tone."

In 2019, The Ringer ranked "Cat's in the Bag..." 31st out of all 62 Breaking Bad episodes. Vulture ranked it 33rd overall.

== See also ==
- MythBusters (2013 season) § Episode 206 – "Breaking Bad Special"
