= Spiralix heisenbergi =

Scientific classification
- Kingdom: Animalia
- Phylum: Mollusca
- Class: Gastropoda
- Subclass: Caenogastropoda
- Order: Littorinimorpha
- Family: Moitessieriidae
- Genus: Spiralix
- Species: S. heisenbergi

Binomial name
- Spiralix heisenbergi Quiñonero-Salgado, Á. Alonso & Rolán, 2021

Synonyms
- Spiralix (Spiralix) heisenbergi Quiñonero-Salgado, Á. Alonso & Rolán, 2021 · alternate representation

Species of snail

Spiralix heisenbergi is a species of small freshwater snail with an operculum, an aquatic gastropod mollusc or micromollusc in the family Moitessieriidae.

== Details ==
Spiralix heisenbergi is a stygobiotic species endemic to Castellón Province in Spain, where it is only known from Fuente de los Ignacios near Argelita.

This species is named after Walter White (pseudonym Heisenberg), the main character of American television series Breaking Bad. It is thought to be in danger due to its restricted habitat.
