= Drive (The X-Files) =

- The X-Files episode
- Episode no.: Season 6 Episode 2
- Directed by: Rob Bowman
- Written by: Vince Gilligan
- Production code: 6ABX02
- Original air date: November 15, 1998
- Running time: 45 minutes

Guest appearances
- Bryan Cranston as Patrick Crump; Janine Venable as Vicky Crump; Junior Brown as Virgil Nokes; Michael O'Neill as Patrol Captain; James Pickens, Jr. as AD Alvin Kersh

Episode chronology
← Previous "The Beginning"	Next → "Triangle"
- The X-Files season 6

"Drive" is the second episode of the sixth season of the science fiction television series The X-Files. It premiered on the Fox network in the United States on November 15, 1998. The episode is a "Monster-of-the-Week" story, unconnected to the series' wider mythology. "Drive" earned a Nielsen household rating of 11.0, being watched by 18.5 million people in its initial broadcast. The episode received largely positive reviews from television critics.

The show centers on FBI special agents Fox Mulder (David Duchovny) and Dana Scully (Gillian Anderson) who work on cases linked to the paranormal, called X-Files. Mulder is a believer in the paranormal, while the skeptical Scully has been assigned to debunk his work. In the episode, Mulder is trapped in a car by a seemingly deranged man, and Scully races to determine if the man is suffering from a deadly illness—and if Mulder is in danger of becoming the next victim of some sort of government conspiracy.

The episode was written by Vince Gilligan, directed by Rob Bowman, and featured a guest appearance by Bryan Cranston. Gilligan cast Cranston to play the antagonist because he felt he could successfully humanize the role. Cranston's performance in "Drive" later led to his casting as Walter White in Gilligan's AMC series Breaking Bad.

== Plot ==
In a live news report, a high-speed car chase comes to an end in the Nevada desert. Assuming it to be a kidnapping, police pull the female passenger from the car and place her in the back of a police vehicle while her husband, Patrick Crump (Bryan Cranston), is handcuffed. The woman begins violently banging her head against the police car window. As the news chopper catches all of this on film, the woman's head explodes, sending a spray of blood across the window.

FBI agents Fox Mulder (David Duchovny) and Dana Scully (Gillian Anderson), investigating possible domestic terrorism in Buhl, Idaho, get wind of the bizarre car chase. Mulder coerces Scully into taking a detour to Elko, Nevada, on a hunch that this may be an X-File. Meanwhile, Crump, who has started to develop symptoms of a sickness, is put in an ambulance. Mulder, wishing to speak to Crump, follows the ambulance, only to end up being kidnapped by Crump when he escapes police custody.

Mulder realizes that Crump is suffering from a painful sensation of pressure building in his head and that the only way to alleviate his symptoms is to drive west. Scully initially believes that Crump is suffering from some sort of infection, taking a hazmat team to investigate the Crumps' home. There, she finds a dog suffering similar symptoms and dead birds on a neighbor's property, although the neighbor herself, who is deaf, was unaffected. Scully then discovers that a United States Navy antenna array emitting ELF waves stretches beneath the Crump property. Scully deduces that an abnormal surge in these waves somehow caused a rising pressure in the inner ear of the nearby inhabitants. Westward motion and an increase in speed seem to be the only thing to help ease the pain of the increasing pressure.

Initially, thinking that the FBI agent is part of a government conspiracy, Crump forces Mulder at gunpoint to drive, trying to provoke him along the way with antisemitic remarks. Eventually, Mulder and Crump make amends and attempt to work out a solution before it is too late. Mulder explains to Crump that Scully will meet them at the Pacific Coast, the end of the highway. There, she will insert a needle into Crump's inner ear, hopefully relieving the pressure. However, by the time Mulder meets Scully and the police at a beach in California, Crump has already died from his condition. Back in Washington D.C., Mulder and Scully are reprimanded by Assistant Director Kersh for straying from their original assignment and amassing large debts during the Crump investigation, and are forbidden from investigating any further X-Files cases.

== Production ==
=== Conception, writing, and filming ===
Vince Gilligan, the writer of "Drive", was inspired to pen the episode based on an earlier idea he had about a man holding an individual hostage on a Tilt-A-Whirl. Gilligan had pitched this idea at several previous story meetings and it soon became a recurring joke among the writing team, many of whom felt that the premise lacked an X-Files-like mystery. Gilligan soon revised his story so that after the ride was shut off, the man's head would explode. This led to Gilligan researching various government experiments, and soon he learned about two real-life military experiments: Project HAARP and Project ELF. The former is an ionospheric research program jointly funded by the U.S. Air Force, the U.S. Navy, the University of Alaska Fairbanks, and the Defense Advanced Research Projects Agency (DARPA), whereas the latter is a U.S. Navy experiment dealing with long wavelengths. Gilligan thus wrote a script that featured an individual who, due to a secret experiment involving soundwaves, could not slow down for fear of rupturing his head.

Gilligan admitted that the episode was partially an homage to the action film Speed (1994), and contains a reference to the film: when Crump and Mulder discover that speeding west is the key to success, Mulder mentions that he thinks he "saw this movie." The opening teaser footage is done in the style of a news report, a stylistic direction that IGN suggested was intended to echo the O.J. Simpson Ford Bronco chase from 1994.

=== Casting ===
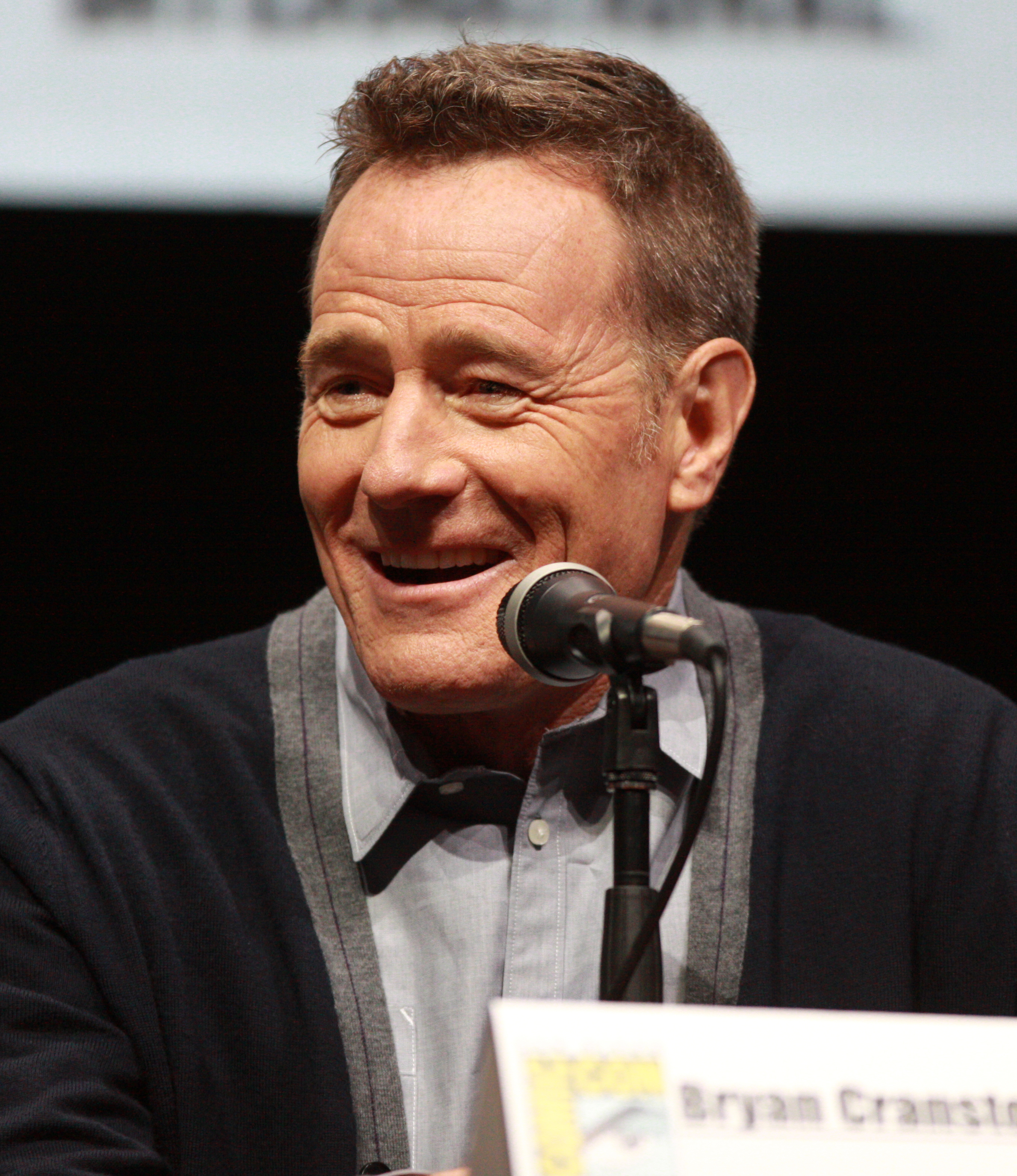
Bryan Cranston's part in "Drive" was instrumental in his casting as Walter White.

Gilligan wanted Bryan Cranston to be the episode's antagonist because, "[The series] needed a guy who could be scary and kind of loathsome but at the same time had a deep, resounding humanity." In an interview with The New York Times, Gilligan stated, "We had this villain, and we needed the audience to feel bad for him when he died. Bryan alone was the only actor who could do that, who could pull off that trick. And it is a trick. I have no idea how he does it." Rick Millikan, the casting director for The X-Files very nearly did not cast Cranston; in fact, a different actor had already been cast when Cranston arrived to try out for the part. Despite the part having already been cast, Millikan allowed Cranston to audition and was very pleased with his performance, eventually choosing him for the part.

Cranston's work on this episode would later have a major impact on his career, as it led to Gilligan casting him as the central character Walter White in the AMC series Breaking Bad. Initially, AMC executives were unsure of this decision as they were familiar only with Cranston's work on the sitcom Malcolm in the Middle. However, they were convinced after viewing his performance in "Drive".

Gilligan, a fan of country musician Junior Brown, cast Brown as Virgil Nokes, the farmer who Mulder and Scully investigate at the beginning of the episode. Brown was flown in at the request and personal expense of Gilligan.

== Reception ==
=== Ratings ===
"Drive" first aired in the United States on November 15, 1998. This episode earned a Nielsen rating of 11.0, with a 16 share, meaning that roughly 11.0 percent of all television-equipped households, and 16 percent of households watching television, were tuned in to the episode. It was viewed by 18.50 million viewers. The episode aired in the United Kingdom and Ireland on Sky1 on March 14, 1999 and was watched by 0.70 million viewers, making it the sixth most viewed episode that week.

=== Reviews ===
"Drive" received largely positive reviews from critics. Zack Handlen from The A.V. Club wrote positively of the episode, awarding it an A, and writing that the entry was "a great example of the engine that keeps great television moving." Handlen noted that the climax of the episode was "as moving as it is suspenseful" and drew parallels between Bryan Cranston's portrayal of Mr. Crump and his eventual portrayal of Walter White from Breaking Bad, noting that both illustrate the idea that "you have to keep moving. If you stop, you die." Review website IGN named it the ninth best standalone X-Files episode of the entire series and complimented the interaction between Crump and Mulder, writing "it's the interplay between Mulder and Crump that makes this episode a standout. [...] Crump here is an antagonistic yet heartbreaking character, and as he and Mulder become unlikely allies in their 'drive,' 'Drive' in turn becomes a memorably scary X-Files episode [...] because of the perhaps most frightening element of the show's world ever: mankind itself, and the governments that supposedly protect us."

Colin Ellis from The Dashing Fellows called "Drive," "arguably one of the best episodes post-Fight the Future of [The X-Files]." Tom Kessenich, in his book Examination: An Unauthorized Look at Seasons 6–9 of the X-Files wrote positively of the episode, saying "[T]hank God for 'Drive', which taps into the idea of Speed, the hit movie starring [Keanu] Reeves, but pushes it in an excitingly different direction." He further went on to praise Gilligan's writing, noting that the writer took the premise of Speed and added "a wonderful X-Files twist". Paula Vitaris from Cinefantastique gave the episode a largely positive review and awarded it three stars out of four. Although she slightly criticized the case being investigated as "pure hokum", Vitaris praised Mulder and Scully's teamwork, and their ability to work together despite being separated.

=== Awards ===
"Drive" earned an ASC Award by the American Society of Cinematographers for Outstanding Achievement in Cinematography – Regular Series.

== Bibliography ==
- Kessenich, Tom (2002). Examination: An Unauthorized Look at Seasons 6–9 of the X-Files. Trafford Publishing. ISBN 1-55369-812-6.
- Meisler, Andy (2000). The End and the Beginning: The Official Guide to the X-Files Season 6. HarperCollins. ISBN 0-06-107595-7.
