= Breaking Bad season 1 =

First season of the AMC crime drama television series

Breaking Bad
- Season 1
- DVD cover
- Showrunner: Vince Gilligan
- Starring: Bryan Cranston; Anna Gunn; Aaron Paul; Dean Norris; Betsy Brandt; RJ Mitte
- No. of episodes: 7

Release
- Original network: AMC
- Original release: January 20 – March 9, 2008

Season chronology
- Next → Season 2

The first season of the American television drama series Breaking Bad premiered on January 20, 2008, and concluded on March 9, 2008. It consisted of seven episodes, each running approximately 48 minutes in length, except the pilot episode which runs for approximately 58 minutes. AMC broadcast the first season on Sundays at 10:00 pm in the United States. The first season was originally going to consist of nine episodes, but was reduced to seven by the 2007–2008 Writers Guild of America strike. The complete first season was released on Region 1 DVD on February 24, 2009 and Region A Blu-ray on March 16, 2010.

== Cast ==
=== Main ===
- Bryan Cranston as Walter "Walt" White, a high-school chemistry teacher in Albuquerque, New Mexico. After being diagnosed with Stage 3 lung cancer and given two years to live, Walt enters into a partnership with a former student to cook crystal meth as a means of supporting his family.
- Anna Gunn as Skyler White, Walt's pregnant wife and a struggling creative writer.
- Aaron Paul as Jesse Pinkman, a small-time drug dealer and former student of Walt who partners with him to cook and sell crystal meth.
- Dean Norris as Hank Schrader, Walt and Skyler's brother-in-law and a DEA agent.
- Betsy Brandt as Marie Schrader, Skyler's sister and Hank's wife. She is a radiologic technologist.
- RJ Mitte as Walter White Jr., Walt and Skyler's son who has cerebral palsy.

=== Recurring ===
- Steven Michael Quezada as Steven Gomez, Hank's partner at the DEA.
- Carmen Serano as Principal Carmen Molina, the principal of J.P. Wynne High School.
- Max Arciniega as Krazy-8 Molina, an associate of Jesse's.
- Charles Baker as Skinny Pete, one of Jesse's friends.
- Raymond Cruz as Tuco Salamanca, a drug kingpin associated with the cartel.
- Jessica Hecht as Gretchen Schwartz, Walt's former fiancée and business partner.

=== Guest ===
- Tess Harper as Mrs. Pinkman, Jesse's mother.
- Matt L. Jones as Brandon "Badger" Mayhew, one of Jesse's friends.
- Rodney Rush as Combo, one of Jesse's friends.
- Marius Stan as Bogdan Wolynetz, the owner of A1A Car Wash, where Walt was formerly employed.
- John Koyama as Emilio Koyama, another associate of Jesse's who is caught in a drug bust by the DEA.

== Episodes ==
No. overall	No. in season	Title	Directed by	Written by	Original release date	U.S. viewers (millions)
1	1	"Pilot"	Vince Gilligan	Vince Gilligan	January 20, 2008	1.41
Walter White, a milquetoast high school chemistry teacher dissatisfied with life, celebrates his 50th birthday breakfast with his wife, Skyler, and their teenage son, Walter Jr. Later at his second job at a car wash, Walter faints following a coughing fit; at the hospital, he is diagnosed with Stage 3 terminal lung cancer. Walt does a ride-along on a methamphetamine lab raid with his brother-in-law, DEA Agent Hank Schrader. DEA agents apprehend a cook/dealer named Emilio. Walt, waiting in the car, spots his former student Jesse Pinkman escaping the raid through a neighbor's window, but says nothing to Hank. Walt tracks down Jesse to propose a partnership wherein Walt cooks crystal meth and Jesse manages sales and distribution. They begin cooking crystal meth in a remote area of the desert in a recreational vehicle; Walt's skill in chemistry results in a pure, highly valuable product. Jesse approaches Krazy-8, a local distributor and cousin to Emilio, to arrange distribution. At a meetup with Walt, Emilio recognizes him from the DEA raid. A panicked Jesse tells Walt to run but knocks himself unconscious. Knowing the dealers intend to kill them both, Walt pretends to teach Emilio and Krazy-8 the crystal meth recipe before poisoning them with phosphine gas and driving off.
2	2	"Cat's in the Bag..."	Adam Bernstein	Vince Gilligan	January 27, 2008	1.49
Returning to Jesse's house in Albuquerque, Walt and Jesse try to dispose of the two bodies in the RV, but Krazy-8 disappears. Driving back to Jesse's from work, Walt discovers a barely-conscious Krazy-8 wandering the streets of Jesse's neighborhood; Walt returns him to the house and restrains him in the basement with a bicycle lock. Walt procrastinates killing Krazy-8, instead providing him with food, water, and a means to relieve himself. Meanwhile, Skyler grows suspicious of Walt's recent behavior and, at an ultrasound appointment, questions him about his recent phone call with Jesse. Walt covers by telling her that Jesse sells him marijuana. Skyler visits Jesse and threatens to call Hank if Jesse contacts Walt about marijuana again. Jesse disposes of Emilio's dead body using hydrofluoric acid as instructed by Walt, but he uses his bathtub instead of Walt's suggestion of a plastic bin, resulting in the acid eating through the bathtub floor and leaving a huge mess of dissolved body parts. Two children playing in the desert area where the RV had been find a gas mask that Walt and Jesse accidentally left behind.
3	3	"...And the Bag's in the River"	Adam Bernstein	Vince Gilligan	February 10, 2008	1.08
Skyler's sister, Marie, mistakenly believes that Walter Jr. is smoking marijuana and asks Hank to scare him straight. Hank takes Walt Jr. to a rundown motel to tell him about "gateway drugs". Walt and Jesse clean up the remains of Emilio, and Walt is torn between whether to keep Krazy-8 alive or kill him. While bringing Krazy-8 food, Walt collapses while descending the stairs and smashes the plate on the floor. Upon waking up, Walt reveals to Krazy-8 that he has lung cancer—the first person he tells—and they start sharing the unexpected things they have in common. Krazy-8 also sows mistrust against Jesse, warning Walt about working with a drug addict. Walt decides to release Krazy-8, but while disposing of the shards of the broken plate, he sees that a shard is missing, and realizes that Krazy-8 has concealed it to use as a weapon. When Walt confronts Krazy-8, Krazy-8 attacks him; Walt strangles and kills him with the bicycle lock restraint. Walt lies and tells Skyler he was working late at the car wash, but she has already talked to his boss and knows he quit weeks ago. That night, Walt returns home and tells Skyler that they need to talk.
4	4	"Cancer Man"	Jim McKay	Vince Gilligan	February 17, 2008	1.09
As Jesse and Walt's meth begins to spread in Albuquerque, Hank starts looking for the new drug kingpin, unaware that it is Walt. At a family barbecue, Walt reveals to Walt Jr., Marie, and Hank that he has cancer. Hank promises Walt that he will always take care of his family. Walt Jr. becomes upset that Walt is acting like everything is normal. Jesse becomes paranoid that law enforcement is after him, and he visits his family's house; Jesse's parents are disappointed and worried to see him in such a state. Jesse finds out that his younger brother, who is very successful in sports and music, is smoking marijuana to deal with the intense pressure from their parents. Jesse covers for him but is forced to leave his parents' house, as they believe the marijuana is his. Jesse visits Walt to try and convince him they should continue cooking, but Walt tells him never to try to see him again. Walt and Skyler visit an oncologist who reveals that Walt's cancer is treatable. Skyler is hopeful, but Walt does not think getting treatment is financially feasible.
5	5	"Gray Matter"	Tricia Brock	Patty Lin	February 24, 2008	0.97 (Note: The data can be calculated by taking the season's total number of viewers (8.61 million) and subtracting the official totals from each of the other season one episodes.)
Walt and Skyler attend the birthday party of Elliott Schwartz, Walt's former colleague and current CEO of Gray Matter Technologies. Walt also reunites with Gretchen Schwartz, his former fiancée and Elliott's current wife and business partner. After reminiscing with Walt about their time as graduate students, Elliott offers him a job at Gray Matter. Realizing that Skyler must have told Elliott about his cancer diagnosis, Walt declines, believing it to be charity. Jesse becomes frustrated that he cannot secure stable employment outside of the drug world, and he unsuccessfully attempts to replicate Walt's meth recipe with his friend Badger. Walt Jr. is busted by a cop for trying to purchase beer as a minor and calls Hank to pick him up; Hank lectures Walt Jr. for not contacting his own father. Walt's family attempts an intervention to persuade him to undergo chemotherapy. Walt insists that he needs the agency to make a choice for himself and that he does not want to live his last days miserable with treatment. The next morning, he relents and tells Skyler he will accept Gretchen and Elliott's offer to cover the cost of his treatment. Gretchen calls Walt to discuss their offer, but he tells her the assistance isn't needed, lying that his insurance covers treatment after all. Walt then goes to Jesse's house and asks to resume their partnership.
6	6	"Crazy Handful of Nothin'"	Bronwen Hughes	George Mastras	March 2, 2008	1.07
Walt undergoes his first chemotherapy session. Walt and Jesse continue their agreement in which Walt will cook the meth while Jesse handles sales. When Walt removes his shirt during a cooking session, Jesse recognizes the radiation therapy marks on Walt's chest and deduces that he has lung cancer. Meanwhile, Hank ties the recovered respirator to Walt's high school's chemistry lab. Hank falsely arrests the kindly school janitor on charges of stealing equipment, who has a criminal record for drug possession and had a small amount of marijuana in his car. Walt shaves his head when he discovers that his hair is falling out. When their initial batch of meth only yields $2,600, Walt insists they need to ramp up production. Jesse's friend Skinny Pete introduces him to the distributor who replaced Krazy-8: psychopathic drug lord Tuco Salamanca. When Jesse demands up-front payment for the meth, Tuco severely beats him and steals the meth. Walt later confronts Tuco on his own, causing an explosion in his hideout, and forces him to pay for the stolen meth. Impressed, Tuco agrees to work with Walt.
7	7	"A No-Rough-Stuff-Type Deal"	Tim Hunter	Peter Gould	March 9, 2008	1.50
Walt and Jesse face production difficulties when they are not able to procure enough pseudoephedrine pills. Jesse, who is now living in the RV, puts his house on the market. Skyler throws a baby shower, during which Marie gifts her a diamond tiara for the baby. Skyler decides to return the tiara, only to be detained at the store and informed that it had been stolen. Upon being confronted by Skyler, Marie flatly denies stealing it. Walt and Jesse break into a warehouse and steal a large barrel of methylamine to produce larger amount of meth by an alternative cooking process. They deliver the promised amount of meth (4 lbs) to Tuco and his associates, No-Doze and Gonzo. When No-Doze makes an offhanded remark to Walt, Tuco becomes enraged and savagely beats him in front of the horrified Walt and Jesse before driving away.

== Music ==
Breaking Bad's original score is composed by Dave Porter. The show also uses music from other recording artists with music supervision by Thomas Golubić. Select songs from Season 1 are featured on the Breaking Bad Soundtrack available through iTunes and Amazon.

== Reception ==
=== Reviews ===
On review aggregator Rotten Tomatoes, the series' first season has an approval rating of 86% based on 43 reviews, with an average rating of 8.3/10. The site's critics consensus reads: "Though at times it feels forced and its imagery can be gruesome, Breaking Bad is darkly gripping and features a strong sympathetic lead in Bryan Cranston." The first season of Breaking Bad also received generally favorable reviews on Metacritic, scoring a 73 out of 100.

New York Post critic Linda Stasi praised the series, particularly the acting of Cranston and Paul. Robert Bianco of USA Today extolled the humor in the show, "mostly in Walt's efforts to impose scholarly logic on the business and on his idiot apprentice, a role Paul plays very well. But even their scenes lean toward the suspenseful, as the duo learns that killing someone, even in self-defense, is ugly, messy work." Troy Patterson of Slate was more critical, who, despite praising the show's dark humor and the performances by the leading cast, criticized the overall structure and layout of each episode, stating: "Imagine the Coen brothers directing an episode of Weeds, and you have Breaking Bad."

=== Awards and nominations ===
The first season received numerous awards and nominations, including four Primetime Emmy Award nominations with two wins. Bryan Cranston won for Outstanding Lead Actor in a Drama Series and Lynne Willingham won for Outstanding Single-Camera Picture Editing for a Drama Series. Vince Gilligan was nominated for Outstanding Directing for a Drama Series for the pilot episode and John Toll was nominated for Outstanding Cinematography for a One-Hour Series for the pilot episode. Cranston also won a Satellite Award for Best Actor in a Drama Series. The series was nominated for Outstanding New Program of the Year at the Television Critics Association Awards. The series also received three Writers Guild of America Award nominations with one win. It was nominated for Best New Series, Patty Lin was nominated for Best Episodic Drama for "Gray Matter", and Vince Gilligan won for Best Episodic Drama for his work on the pilot.

Year	Award	Category	Recipient	Result	Ref.
2008	Primetime Emmy Awards	Outstanding Actor in a Drama Series	Bryan Cranston for "Pilot"	Won	
2008	Primetime Emmy Awards	Outstanding Directing for a Drama Series	Vince Gilligan for "Pilot"	Nominated	
2008	Primetime Emmy Awards	Outstanding Cinematography for a Single-Camera Series (One Hour)	John Toll for "Pilot"	Nominated	
2008	Primetime Emmy Awards	Outstanding Single-Camera Picture Editing - Drama Series	Lynne Willingham for "Pilot"	Won	

== Home media ==
The first season was released on DVD in Region 1 on February 24, 2009, in Region 2 on December 14, 2009, and in Region 4 on July 8, 2009. It was released on Blu-ray in Region A on March 16, 2010. Special features on the DVD and Blu-ray include two audio commentaries—"Pilot" by creator Vince Gilligan, cast members Bryan Cranston, Anna Gunn, Aaron Paul, Dean Norris, Betsy Brandt, and RJ Mitte, and editor Lynne Willingham and "Crazy Handful of Nothin'" by Vince Gilligan, Bryan Cranston, Anna Gunn, Aaron Paul, Dean Norris, and writer George Mastras; "The Making of Breaking Bad"; "Inside Breaking Bad"; AMC Shootout – Interview with Vince Gilligan, Bryan Cranston, and Mark Johnson; deleted scenes; screen tests; and Vince Gilligan's photo gallery.
