= Spiralix rayi =

Conservation status
- Least Concern (IUCN 3.1)

Scientific classification
- Kingdom: Animalia
- Phylum: Mollusca
- Class: Gastropoda
- Subclass: Caenogastropoda
- Order: Littorinimorpha
- Family: Moitessieriidae
- Genus: Spiralix
- Species: S. rayi

Binomial name
- Spiralix rayi (Locard, 1882)

Synonyms
- Lartetia rayi Locard, 1882 (original combination); Moitessieria rayi (Locard, 1882)

Species of gastropod

Spiralix rayi is a species of small freshwater snail with an operculum, an aquatic gastropod molluscs or micromolluscs in the family Moitessieriidae. This species is endemic to France.
