= Bronwen Hughes =

Canadian film director

- Born: Toronto, Ontario, Canada
- Occupations: Television director, film director, screenwriter
- Years active: 1985–present
- Partner: Egidio Coccimiglio
- Children: 1

Bronwen Hughes is a Canadian film director. She was born in Toronto and is of Welsh descent. A graduate of the Department of Film, York University, she has directed commercials and feature films.

== Filmography ==
=== Film ===
Director

Year	Title	Role	Ref.
1996	Harriet the Spy		
1999	Forces of Nature		
2003	Stander	Also music supervisor	
2013	Over/Under		
2016	The Journey Is the Destination	Also writer	

Other credits

Year	Title	Role
1986	Confidential	Editor
1987	Caribe	Art director
2000	Woman on Top	Executive producer

=== Television ===
Year	Title	Director	Executive Producer	Notes	Ref.
1994	The Kids in the Hall	Yes	No	3 episodes	
2006–2007	The L Word	Yes	No	3 episodes	
2008	Breaking Bad	Yes	No	Episode "Crazy Handful of Nothin'"	
2008	Burn Notice	Yes	No	Episode "Bad Blood"	
2009	Royal Pains	Yes	No	Episode "Crazy Love"	
2009	White Collar	Yes	No	Episode "Pilot"	
2009–2011	Hung	Yes	No	4 episodes	
2011	Fairly Legal	Yes	No	Episode "Pilot"	
2013–2015	Motive	Yes	Yes	Directed 3 episodes	
2014	Black Box	Yes	No	2 episodes	
2014	The Mysteries of Laura	Yes	No	Episode "The Mystery of the Sex Scandal"	
2014	Stalker	Yes	No	Episode "Manhunt"	
2015	Allegiance	Yes	No	Episode "Blowback"	
2015	Teen Wolf	Yes	No	Episode "Condition Terminal"	
2016	Damien	Yes	No	Episode "The Number of a Man"	
2016	Shut Eye	Yes	No	Episode "Five of Cups"	
2016–2017	Hawaii Five-0	Yes	No	3 episodes	
2017	24: Legacy	Yes	No	2 episodes	
2017	Queen of the South	Yes	No	Episode "Sacar Con Sifón el Mar"	
2017	The Good Doctor	Yes	No	Episode "Intangibles"	
2017–2018	Berlin Station	Yes	No	4 episodes	
2018–2019	The Resident	Yes	No	3 episodes	
2019	13 Reasons Why	Yes	No	2 episodes	
2019	All Rise	Yes	No	Episode "A View from the Bus"	
2020	Dare Me	Yes	No	Episode "Scorched Earth"	
2020	Better Call Saul	Yes	No	Episode "Magic Man"	
2020	The Walking Dead	Yes	No	Episode "Stalker"	
2020	Magnum P.I.	Yes	No	Episode "Farewell to Love"	
2020	Away	Yes	No	2 episodes	
2022	Resident Evil	Yes	Yes	Directed 2 episodes	
2024	Bodkin	Yes	No	3 episodes	

== Music videos ==
- Silk - "Freak Me" (1993)
- Amy Grant - "Lucky One" (1994)

== Awards ==
- 25th Genie Award (2005): nominated for Best Achievement in Direction for Stander
