= Patty Lin =

American screenwriter

- Born: Chicago, Illinois, U.S.
- Education: Cornell University
- Occupations: Author, Television writer and producer
- Writing career
- Notable works: Breaking Bad, Desperate Housewives, Friends, Freaks and Geeks

Patty Lin is an American author and former television screenwriter and producer. She is a graduate of Cornell University.

== Career ==
She has written episodes for the television series Friends, Freaks and Geeks, Martial Law, Citizen Baines, Desperate Housewives, Leap of Faith, and Breaking Bad. She has served as producer for a number of episodes from Desperate Housewives, Leap of Faith, and Citizen Baines, as well as executive story editor for five Friends episodes.

Lin joined the crew of the first season of Breaking Bad in 2008 as a writer and producer. She wrote the first-season episode "Gray Matter". The first season writing staff were nominated for the Writers Guild of America (WGA) Award for best new series at the February 2009 ceremony. Lin was personally nominated for the WGA award for best episodic drama for writing "Gray Matter".

Her memoir focusing on her work in television, End Credits: How I Broke Up with Hollywood, was released August 29, 2023.
