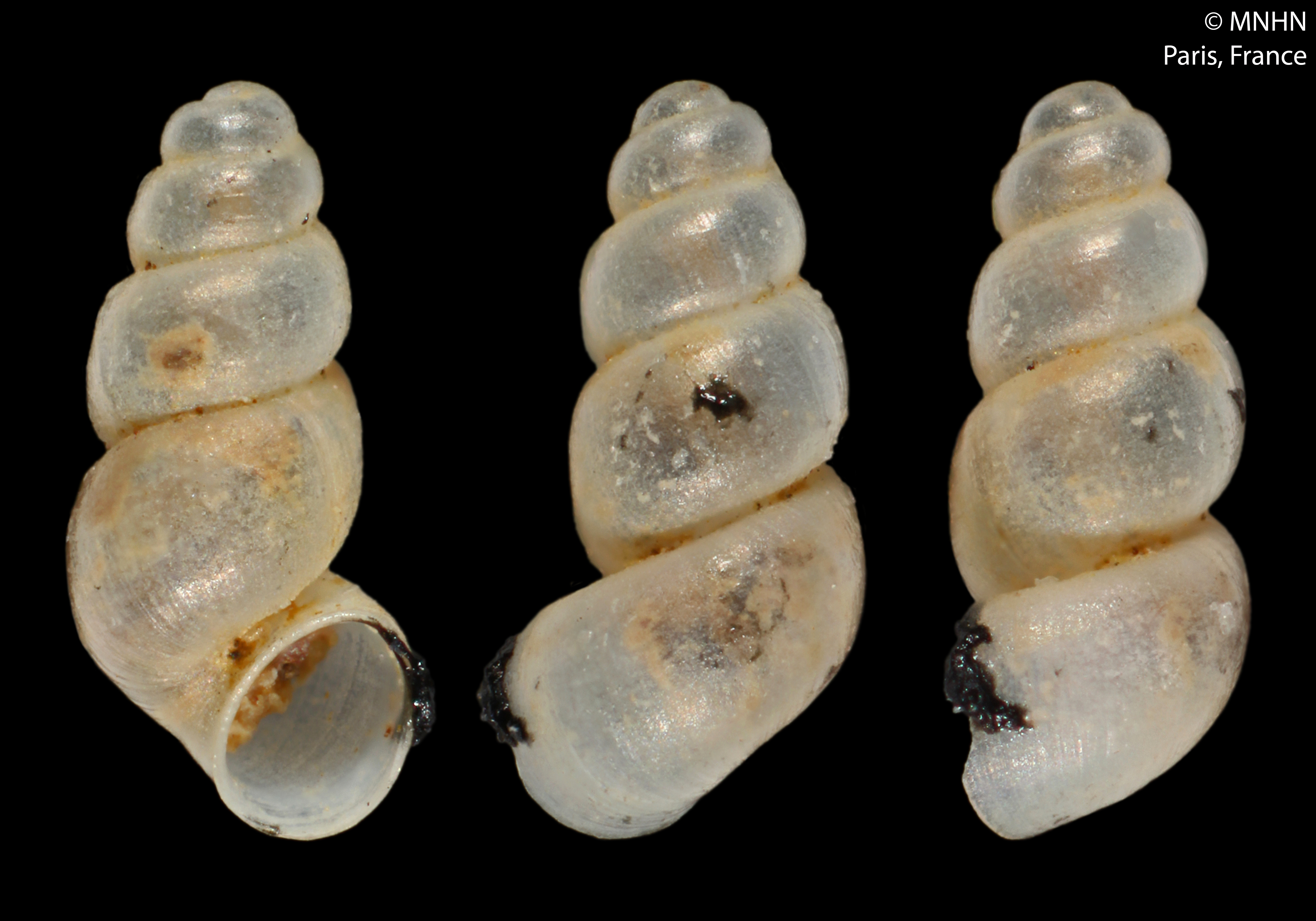
- Shell of Spiralix asturica (paratype at MNHN, Paris)

Scientific classification
- Kingdom: Animalia
- Phylum: Mollusca
- Class: Gastropoda
- Subclass: Caenogastropoda
- Order: Littorinimorpha
- Superfamily: Truncatelloidea
- Family: Moitessieriidae
- Genus: Spiralix; Boeters, 1972

Type species
- Lartetia rayi Bourguignat, 1883

Synonyms
- Moitessieria (Spiralix) Boeters, 1972 (new combination); Paladilhia (Spiralix) Boeters, 1972 (original rank); Spiralix (Burgosia) Boeters, 2003 · alternate representation; Spiralix (Spiralix) Boeters, 1972 · alternate representation

= Spiralix =

Genus of gastropods

Spiralix is a genus of very small aquatic snails, operculate gastropod mollusks in the family Moitessieriidae.

== Species ==
- Spiralix affinitatis Boeters, 2003
- Spiralix asturica Quiñonero-Salgado, Ruiz-Cobo & Rolán, 2017
- Spiralix burgensis Boeters, 2003
- Spiralix burgundina (Locard, 1883)
- Spiralix calida Corbella, Guillén, Prats, Tarruella & Alba, 2014
- Spiralix clarae Quiñonero-Salgado, Ruiz-Cobo & Rolán, 2017
- Spiralix collieri (Nicolas, 1891)
- Spiralix cubelli Quiñonero-Salgado, López-Soriano, Á. Alonso & Rolán, 2020
- Spiralix gloriae (Rolán & Martínez-Ortí, 2003)
- Spiralix gusii Quiñonero-Salgado, López-Soriano, Á. Alonso & Rolán, 2020
- Spiralix heisenbergi Quiñonero-Salgado, Á. Alonso & Rolán, 2021
- Spiralix hofmanni Boeters & Falkner, 2003
- Spiralix kuiperi Boeters & Falkner, 2009
- Spiralix mieraensis Quiñonero-Salgado, Ruiz-Cobo & Rolán, 2017
- Spiralix ovidiensis Girardi & Bertrand, 2009
- Spiralix pequenoensis Boeters, 2003
- Spiralix puteana (Coutagne, 1883)
- Spiralix rayi (Bourguignat, 1883)
- Spiralix thaisensis Girardi, 2009
- Spiralix tuba Quiñonero-Salgado, Á. Alonso & Rolán, 2019
- Spiralix valenciana Boeters, 2003
- Spiralix vetusta Quiñonero-Salgado, Á. Alonso & Rolán, 2018
- Spiralix vitrea (Draparnaud, 1801)

Synonyms

- Spiralix corsica (R. Bernasconi, 1994) : synonym of Corseria corsica (R. Bernasconi, 1994) (new combination)
