= Walter White (Breaking Bad) =

Breaking Bad character

- Breaking Bad character
- Bryan Cranston as Walter White
- First appearance: "Pilot"; Breaking Bad; January 20, 2008
- Last appearance: "Saul Gone"; Better Call Saul; August 15, 2022
- Created by: Vince Gilligan
- Portrayed by: Bryan Cranston

In-universe information
- Full name: Walter Hartwell White
- Aliases: Heisenberg; Walter White Sr. Mr. Lambert
- Nickname: Walt
- Occupation: Drug lord; Co-founder of Gray Matter Technologies; High school chemistry teacher; Car wash cashier, proprietor, and manager
- Affiliation: Gray Matter Technologies; Gustavo Fring's drug empire His own drug empire
- Spouse: Skyler White
- Significant other: Gretchen Schwartz (formerly)
- Children: Walter White Jr. (son); Holly White (daughter)
- Relatives: Hank Schrader (brother-in-law); Marie Schrader (sister-in-law)
- Home: 308 Negra Arroyo Lane, Albuquerque, New Mexico, United States; New Hampshire, United States (Remote)
- Nationality: American
- Date of birth: September 7, 1958
- Date of death: September 7, 2010 (aged 52)
- Alma mater: California Institute of Technology
- Cause of death: Shot by his gun connected to the inside of the trunk of his car

Walter Hartwell White, also known by his alias Heisenberg, is a fictional character and the protagonist of the American crime drama television series Breaking Bad. He is portrayed by Bryan Cranston.

Walter is a skilled chemist who co-founded a technology firm before he accepted a buy-out from his partners. While his partners became wealthy, Walter became a high school chemistry teacher in Albuquerque, New Mexico, barely making ends meet with his family: his wife Skyler (Anna Gunn) and their son Walter Jr. (RJ Mitte). At the start of the series, the day after his 50th birthday, he is diagnosed with Stage III lung cancer. After this discovery, Walter decides to manufacture and sell methamphetamine with his former student Jesse Pinkman (Aaron Paul), to ensure his family's financial security after his death. Due to his expertise, Walter's "blue meth" is purer than any other on the market, and he is pulled deeper into the illicit drug trade.

An antihero (Note: Attributed to multiple sources:) turned villain protagonist as the series progresses, Walter becomes increasingly ruthless and unsympathetic, as the series' creator, Vince Gilligan, wanted him to turn from "Mr. Chips into Scarface". He adopts the alias "Heisenberg", which becomes recognizable as a kingpin figure in the Southwestern drug trade. Walter struggles with managing his family while hiding his involvement in the drug business from his brother-in-law, Hank Schrader (Dean Norris), an agent of the Drug Enforcement Administration. Although AMC officials initially hesitated to cast Cranston due to his previous comedic role in Malcolm in the Middle, Gilligan cast him based on his past performance in The X-Files episode "Drive", which Gilligan wrote. Cranston contributed greatly to the creation of his character, including Walter's backstory, personality, and physical appearance.

Both Walter and Cranston's performance have received critical acclaim, and Walter has frequently been mentioned as one of the greatest and most iconic television characters ever created. Cranston won four Primetime Emmy Awards for Outstanding Lead Actor in a Drama Series, three of them being consecutive. He is the first man to win a Critics' Choice, Golden Globe, Primetime Emmy, and Actor Award for his performance. Cranston reprised the role in a flashback for Breaking Bad's sequel film, El Camino: A Breaking Bad Movie, and again in the sixth and final season of the prequel series Better Call Saul, making him one of the few characters to appear in all three, alongside Jesse Pinkman, Mike Ehrmantraut (Jonathan Banks), Ed Galbraith (Robert Forster) and Austin Ramey (Todd Terry).

== Concept and creation ==
You're going to see that underlying humanity, even when he's making the most devious, terrible decisions, and you need someone who has that humanity – deep down, bedrock humanity – so you say, watching this show, 'All right, I'll go for this ride. I don't like what he's doing, but I understand, and I'll go with it for as far as it goes.' If you don't have a guy who gives you that, despite the greatest acting chops in the world, the show is not going to succeed.

— Vince Gilligan, about Bryan Cranston

Inspired by Tony Soprano, Breaking Bad's creator, Vince Gilligan, wanted his lead character to be a protagonist that turned into an antagonist over the course of the show, or as he described, turning Mr. Chips into Scarface. In the aftermath of the death of James Gandolfini (who portrayed Soprano) in 2013, Gilligan said, "Without Tony Soprano, there would be no Walter White." Gilligan needed to have this character come into a midlife crisis that would put him into seeking risky options and lead to more criminal activities. As the premise of Breaking Bad was based on a humorous idea that he and his fellow writer from The X-Files Thomas Schnauz had come up with of driving around in a recreational vehicle and making methamphetamine, Gilligan made Walter a chemistry teacher, one who, until the start of the show, would never have violated the law.

Gilligan cast Cranston based on having worked with him in "Drive" from The X-Files, on which Gilligan worked as a writer. Cranston played an antisemite with a terminal illness who took Fox Mulder (David Duchovny) hostage. Gilligan said the character had to be simultaneously loathsome and sympathetic, and that "Bryan alone was the only actor who could do that, who could pull off that trick. And it is a trick. I have no idea how he does it." AMC officials were initially reluctant with the casting choice, having known Cranston only as the over-the-top character Hal on the comedy series Malcolm in the Middle and approached the actors John Cusack and Matthew Broderick about the role. When both declined, the executives were persuaded to cast Cranston after seeing the X-Files episode.

Cranston contributed a great deal to the character's persona. When Gilligan left much of Walter's past unexplained during the development of the series, Cranston himself wrote a backstory. At the start of the show, Cranston gained 10 pounds to presage Walter's gradual physical decline. He had the natural red highlights of his hair dyed brown. He collaborated with the costume designer Kathleen Detoro on a wardrobe of mostly neutral green and brown colors to make Walter's appearance bland and unremarkable, and worked with the makeup artist Frieda Valenzuela to create a mustache he described as "impotent" and like a "dead caterpillar". Cranston also repeatedly identified elements in scripts where he disagreed with how the character was handled, and would go so far as to call Gilligan directly when he could not work out disagreements with the episode's screenwriter(s). Cranston has said he was inspired partially by his father for how Walter carries himself physically, which he described as "a little hunched over, never erect, [as if] the weight of the world is on this man's shoulders".

Gilligan has said it has been difficult to write for Walter because he is so dark and morally questionable. As the series progressed, Gilligan and the writing staff of Breaking Bad made Walter increasingly unsympathetic. Cranston said by the fourth season: "I think Walter's figured out it's better to be a pursuer than the pursued. He's well on his way to badass." Regarding Walter's fate in the series' ending, Cranston foresaw it as "ugly [with no] redemption", although earlier, Gilligan divulged his plans to "end on a high note, in a way that will satisfy everyone".

== Character biography ==
=== Background ===
When Walter was six years old, his father died of Huntington's disease. He studied chemistry at the California Institute of Technology and, after graduate school, worked as a researcher at Sandia National Laboratory. There he conducted research on proton radiography that helped a team win a Nobel Prize in Chemistry in 1985. Using some of the prize money, Walter then founded the firm Gray Matter Technologies with Elliott Schwartz (Adam Godley), his former classmate and close friend. Around this time, Walter began a relationship with his lab assistant, Gretchen (Jessica Hecht), who soon after became a partner at Gray Matter. However, after a disastrous Independence Day party, where they had intended to announce their engagement, Walter instead left both Gretchen and Gray Matter Technologies, selling his financial interest in the company for US$5,000. Gretchen and Elliott later married and made billions, much of it from Walter's research. Though they remain friendly, Walter secretly resents both Gretchen and Elliott for profiting from his work.

At the age of 50, Walter works as a high school chemistry teacher in Albuquerque, New Mexico, providing instruction to uninterested and disrespectful students. Walter has a second job at a local car wash to supplement his income, which proves to be particularly humiliating when he has to clean the cars of his own students. Walter and his wife, Skyler, have a teenage son named Walter Jr., who has cerebral palsy. Skyler is also pregnant with their second child, Holly, who is born at the end of season two. Walt's other family includes Skyler's sister, Marie Schrader (Betsy Brandt); her husband, Hank, who is an agent within the Drug Enforcement Administration; and his mother, who is never seen.

=== Appearances ===
The following appearances are based on the chronological narrative in Breaking Bad. Scenes from Better Call Saul fit into this chronology and are denoted appropriately.

==== Season 1 ====
On his 50th birthday, during his surprise party, Walter watches a news report about Hank arresting methamphetamine dealers. Walter is impressed by the monetary returns from the meth operation, and Hank offers to take him as a ride-along to a DEA bust. The next day, Walter faints at the car wash and is taken to a hospital; there, he is told he has inoperable lung cancer and will likely die within the next two years. During the ride-along, Hank busts a crystal meth lab, taking cook Emilio Koyama (John Koyama), into custody. Walter sees Emilio's partner fleeing the scene, and realizes it is his former student Jesse Pinkman. Looking to secure his family's well-being by producing and selling meth, Walter tracks Jesse down and blackmails him into selling the meth that Walter will cook. Walter gives Jesse his life savings to buy a recreational vehicle that they can use as a rolling meth lab.

After their first cook in the RV, Jesse brings a sample of the extremely pure meth to the distributor Domingo "Krazy-8" Molina (Max Arciniega), and then brings Krazy-8 and the now-released Emilio to see the cook site. Emilio recognizes Walter as accompanying the DEA during the bust and believes he is an informant. Krazy-8 forces Walter to show them how he cooked such pure meth or risk being killed. Walter pretends to start a cook but instead produces toxic phosphine gas which kills Emilio and incapacitates Krazy-8. Walter and Jesse secure Krazy-8 to a structural post in Jesse's basement with a U-lock around his neck, and Walter struggles with the decision on whether to kill him. After realizing Krazy-8 has hidden a piece of plate broken when Walter passed out due to a coughing fit, he realizes he has no choice and must kill Krazy-8. Walter goes to unlock Krazy-8's lock and as Walter does so, he confronts him about the plate, causing Krazy-8 to grab the plate to stab Walter with as soon as he is freed. Walter panics and garrotes him to death with the lock while Krazy-8 wildly attacks behind him in an attempt to harm Walter. The experience shakes Walter, and he tells Jesse he will not cook meth anymore.

Walter eventually tells his family about his cancer diagnosis, and they urge him to undergo expensive chemotherapy. He initially does not want to go through the treatment, fearing that his family will remember him as a burden and a helpless invalid, much as he remembers his own father. Later he reluctantly agrees to undergo treatment but refuses Gretchen and Elliott's offer to pay for it, choosing to re-enter the drug trade with Jesse. He shaves his head to hide his chemotherapy-induced hair loss.

Dissatisfied with Jesse's slow pace of selling the meth, Walter pushes him to sell it in bulk to a local drug lord named Tuco Salamanca (Raymond Cruz), who has taken over Krazy-8's former territory. Discovering that Tuco stole the meth and savagely beat Jesse, Walter visits Tuco's lair with another bag of crystals, claiming to be "Heisenberg", a reference to the theoretical physicist Werner Heisenberg. After Tuco mocks Jesse, refuses to pay for the bag, and implies that Walter will suffer the same fate as Jesse, Walter blows up part of the lair; the bag contained fulminated mercury, not meth. Impressed by the boldness of "Heisenberg", Tuco reluctantly agrees to pay for his meth upon delivery in the future.

Walter revels in his success and adopts the Heisenberg alias in his business dealings going forward. In order to make larger batches of meth to take advantage of their new arrangement with Tuco, Walter and Jesse switch from using pseudoephedrine to methylamine as a precursor. This tints their meth blue, which becomes a signature of Walter's product. The pair begin to fear for their lives when, after testing the purity of the meth they delivered by snorting some of it, Tuco senselessly beats to death one of his own men, No-Doze (Cesar Garcia).

==== Season 2 ====
Walter's "blue meth" becomes incredibly popular, to the point that Hank takes notice and raids Tuco's operation. A paranoid Tuco evades the bust, carjacks Jesse, and kidnaps Walter. He brings them to an isolated house in the desert, planning to take them deep into Mexico where they would be forced to cook their blue meth for the cartel. After a failed attempt to poison Tuco, they manage to escape on foot. Hank, who had been searching for Jesse, spots his car at the house and kills Tuco in a gunfight. Walter takes off all his clothes in a grocery store in order to explain his disappearance by claiming that he had gone into a fugue state as a result of his cancer medication and simply wandered off.

Walter finds out that his cancer is in remission, and plans to leave the meth business again after selling the final 38 lb (17 kg) of meth. He hires an unscrupulous criminal attorney named Saul Goodman (Bob Odenkirk), to cover his involvement in the drug trade and launder his drug money. The Better Call Saul episode "Breaking Bad" expands on Walter's and Saul's first meeting where Saul quickly deduces Walter is Heisenberg and urges him to seek higher goals with his meth business. Saul also has his fixer, Mike Ehrmantraut, investigate Walter's background; Mike warns Saul that Walter is unreliable and a bad risk, but Saul goes into business with him anyway.

Seeing that Walter and Jesse need a new distributor to sell the large quantity of product they have remaining, Saul arranges a meeting at a local restaurant with a mysterious meth kingpin. Jesse shows up for the meeting high on heroin, and leaves when the kingpin does not show. Walter realizes that the restaurant owner, Gus Fring (Giancarlo Esposito), was the man they were supposed to meet. Walter meets with Gus, who says that he will not do business with an addict. However, a few days later he gives Walter a chance to prove himself by delivering all the meth to a truck stop within an hour. Walter breaks into Jesse's apartment, where the meth is stored, and finds him passed out with his girlfriend and fellow heroin addict Jane Margolis (Krysten Ritter). He finds the meth and makes the delivery on time, but misses the birth of his daughter. Walter initially refuses to give Jesse his share of the drug money until he is clean, but Jane blackmails him into handing it over.

After talking to a stranger at a bar about family – not knowing that the man is Jane's father Donald (John de Lancie) – Walter again breaks into Jesse's apartment and finds them passed out in a heroin stupor. Walter attempts to wake Jesse and inadvertently rolls Jane onto her back; she subsequently vomits and begins to choke. Walter does nothing to help her and watches her die. He contacts Saul for help, who sends Mike over to clear any connection Jesse has to Jane's death. Walter convinces Jesse to enter drug rehabilitation.

Walter undergoes an operation to remove the remaining cancerous growth. His anesthesia-induced references to a "second cell phone" – the one he uses to deal drugs – makes Skyler suspicious, leading her to uncover many of his lies and leave with their children. Just after her departure, two passenger planes collide directly above Walter's house; the accident was caused by Donald, who works as an air traffic controller, and was still overcome with grief from Jane's death. Walter watches the accident in horror, unaware of his connection to it.

==== Season 3 ====
Walter decides to get out of the meth business, refusing Gus' offer to produce meth in a state-of-the-art laboratory hidden under an industrial laundry for a million dollars a month. Now separated from Skyler and living in an apartment, Walter admits to her that he has been financing his treatment by cooking meth. Horrified, Skyler asks for a divorce in return for her silence and demands that Walter have nothing to do with their children.

After he discovers Jesse is cooking and selling his own version of the blue meth, Walter agrees to cook his meth for Gus. He is assisted by an accomplished chemist named Gale Boetticher (David Costabile) and the business begins running smoothly. Jesse continues to cook his own version of the blue meth, with his friends Skinny Pete (Charles Baker) and Badger (Matt Jones) as his distributors, but this leads to Hank nearly catching Jesse and Walter while following a lead on an RV he believed was being used to cook meth. To avoid being discovered hiding in the RV, Walter and Jesse, aided by Saul, place a phone call to distract Hank, making him believe his wife, Marie, has been injured in a car accident. Hank decides to leave the pursuit of the RV only to find out that Marie is fine, allowing Walter and Jesse to dispose of the vehicle. This enrages Hank enough to storm into Jesse's house and beat him so severely that he is hospitalized.

Walter visits Jesse in the hospital and apologizes for Hank, while also urging him to leave the meth business for good. Jesse replies that he will continue to cook meth on his own and that he will sue Hank for all the money he has. He also tells Walter that if he is caught, he will make a deal to give up "Heisenberg". In an attempt to save Hank's career, Walter convinces Gus to hire Jesse to replace Gale as his assistant and give him a 50 percent share of the profits. Jesse finally accepts the job, and Walter fires Gale from the lab and gives Jesse the assistant's job.

Assuming that Skyler will not turn him in to the police because it would traumatize their children, Walter returns to his house. Skyler eventually comes to uneasily accept the situation and helps Walter to launder his drug money, but refuses to have anything to do with him outside of business. The rift in their marriage worsens when Skyler has sex with her boss, Ted Beneke (Christopher Cousins). Walter attempts to get back at her by making a pass at the principal at his school, who puts him on indefinite suspension.

Tuco's cousins Marco and Leonel Salamanca (Luis and Daniel Moncada) seek revenge against those responsible for his death and find out Walter's identity from their uncle Hector Salamanca (Mark Margolis). Believing that Walter betrayed Tuco, they go to his house and prepare to kill him with a silver axe. Gus discovers this, and to protect his investment in Walter, he convinces them to instead target Hank, who actually killed Tuco. The cousins die in their attempt to kill Hank, but they manage to temporarily paralyze him from the waist down before he dispatches them. Skyler forces Walter into paying for Hank's care and creates a cover story about Walter counting cards at casinos to explain how he made his money.

Walter's relationship with Gus becomes strained when he kills two of Gus' dealers to protect Jesse, who planned to kill them in retaliation for murdering his new girlfriend Andrea Cantillo's (Emily Rios) young brother, who was working for them. Gus responds by putting a hit on Jesse and re-hiring Gale as Walter's assistant, with the intention of replacing Walter as soon as possible. Walter plots to kill Gale to avoid becoming disposable, but Gus' henchman Victor (Jeremiah Bitsui) lures Walter to the laundry facility, where Mike is waiting to kill him. Walter frantically calls Jesse, telling him that he is about to be killed and Jesse will have to take out Gale himself.

==== Season 4 ====
In the aftermath of Gale's murder, Mike holds Walter at the lab to await Gus' arrival. Victor arrives with Jesse and proceeds to start the cooking process himself to show Gus that Walter and Jesse are not indispensable. Gus, however, kills Victor in front of Walter, Jesse and Mike in a gruesome show of force. Gus puts the pair under tighter surveillance, including a camera being installed in the lab to monitor them. A rift slowly forms between Walter and Jesse, and Gus uses the opportunity to bring Jesse to his side by having Mike train him. Walter deduces that Gus plans to eventually kill him and replace him with Jesse. He gives Jesse homemade ricin with which to poison Gus, but Jesse never goes through with it. Walter shows up at Jesse's house and tries to convince him to betray Gus, but Jesse refuses and tells Walter they are finished.

Meanwhile, Skyler buys the car wash where Walter used to work and uses it to launder his drug money. Evidence from Gale's murder leads Hank to suspect that Gus is involved in the blue meth business. With the DEA skeptical and Hank being unable to drive due to his condition, he enlists Walter's help in the investigation as a driver and tracker. Walter attempts to sabotage the investigation, but Gus blames him for drawing Hank's attention.

Gus rids himself of the Mexican cartel's influence in the area with the help of Mike and Jesse. He then fires Walter and threatens to kill his entire family if he causes any more trouble. Walter tries to use one of Saul's connections to get him and his family relocated but finds that Skyler has used most of his drug money to pay off Ted Beneke's IRS fines to avoid having their own lives investigated. After arranging for Saul to report that Hank is being targeted for assassination again so that his family would be protected by the DEA, Walter resolves to kill Gus.

When Andrea's young son Brock (Ian Posada) falls desperately ill with ricin-like symptoms, Jesse attacks Walter, believing that he poisoned the boy. Walter manages to convince Jesse that Gus is the one responsible. After an attempt to kill Gus with a car bomb fails, Walter discovers from Saul that Gus has been visiting Hector in his nursing home to taunt him about the cartel's defeat and the end of the Salamanca family. Walter makes a deal with Hector to draw Gus in by setting up a meeting with the DEA. When Gus comes to the nursing home to kill Hector for apparently becoming an informant, Hector detonates a pipe bomb Walter built, killing himself, Gus's henchman Tyrus Kitt (Ray Campbell) and Gus. Walter rescues Jesse, who had been kept as a prisoner in the lab, and together they destroy all the evidence and burn down the lab.

After Brock recovers, Jesse learns that the boy had likely been poisoned by accidentally eating lily of the valley berries, not ricin. Walter responds that killing Gus was still the right thing to do. Walter calls Skyler to tell her they are safe and that he has "won". The camera pans to a potted lily of the valley plant next to Walt's pool, revealing that Walter had poisoned Brock in order to regain Jesse's loyalty and spur him into action as part of Walter's plan to kill Gus.

==== Season 5 ====
===== Part 1 =====
Walter disposes of the evidence linking him to Gus' death and Brock's poisoning. Mike intends to kill Walter in retaliation for Gus's death, but Jesse intervenes and convinces them to work together to eliminate their connection to the destroyed lab. The trio use an electromagnet to wipe the lab camera footage off of Gus's laptop, which is in police custody. The three eventually start a new meth production system with the help of a corrupt pest control company, using residents' homes to cook meth while they are fumigated, using methylamine provided by Lydia Rodarte-Quayle (Laura Fraser), a representative for the conglomerate that owned Gus's chicken franchise. When her supply is discovered to be tracked by the police, she leaks them information about a train carrying the chemical so they can plan a robbery. The robbery is successful, but Todd Alquist (Jesse Plemons), one of the pest control workers, kills a young boy who had seen them. Horrified, Jesse and Mike resolve to leave the business. A drug lord based in Phoenix, Arizona named Declan (Louis Ferreira) offers to buy out the operation for $15 million in order to remove his competition. Walter convinces him to pay off Mike and begin distributing Walter's meth instead.

Skyler becomes terrified of Walter and stages a suicide attempt to persuade Hank and Marie to take temporary custody of Walter Jr. and Holly. Hank connects Mike to the blue meth and begins pressing several of his associates, who are now in prison, to give information on the blue meth operation. When Walter delivers Mike's share of Declan's payment, Mike refuses to reveal these prisoners' identities and insults Walter, blaming him for all the problems they have encountered; Walter shoots him dead in a fit of rage. Obtaining a list of the prisoners from Lydia, he enlists Todd's uncle Jack Welker (Michael Bowen), a criminal with ties to the Aryan Brotherhood prison gang, to kill the ten men simultaneously at multiple prisons to prevent the DEA from realizing that they were being targeted until it was too late.

After a few months, Walter has earned more than $80 million from meth, and Skyler convinces him to stop. Walter leaves the meth business, and the children return home. During a family barbecue, Hank finds a copy of Walt Whitman's Leaves of Grass in the bathroom, the same copy given to Walter by Gale; upon reading Gale's handwritten inscription referring to Walter as "the other W.W." Hank realizes that Walter is the drug lord he has been pursuing.

===== Part 2 =====
Realizing his copy of Leaves of Grass is missing and that a tracker has been placed on his car, Walter deduces Hank has discovered his criminal activities. Walter confronts him at Hank's house, and Hank accuses him of being Heisenberg, which Walter neither confirms nor denies. Walter says that his cancer is back and he will likely be dead in six months, making an arrest pointless. Hank says they can talk if Walter gives custody of his children to Skyler, Marie and Hank, but Walter refuses and tells Hank to "tread lightly". Walter attempts to discourage Hank from investigating him further by crafting a fake confessional videotape claiming Hank is Heisenberg.

Walter buries his money in seven barrels on the Tohajiilee Indian Reservation and convinces Jesse to go into a relocation program. While waiting to be picked up, Jesse deduces that Walter poisoned Brock. Jesse attempts to burn down Walter's house in retaliation, but Hank stops him and suggests they work together to bring down Walter. With Hank's help, Jesse lures Walter into a trap by claiming to have found his money. Walter makes arrangements with Jack and his men to kill Jesse, in exchange for promising to help teach Todd how to cook meth. When Walter realizes Jesse is with Hank, he tries to call off the deal to protect Hank but is subdued by Hank and his DEA partner Steven Gomez (Steven Michael Quezada). Just then, Jack and his men arrive and fire on the group, killing Gomez and wounding Hank; Jack then executes Hank, despite Walter pleading for his brother-in-law's life. Jack's men take all but one barrel of Walter's money and abduct Jesse; as Jesse is taken away, Walter spitefully tells him that he watched Jane die.

Walter tries to persuade Skyler and Walter Jr. to go on the run with him, but they refuse. He kidnaps Holly, but has a moment of conscience and leaves her to be found and returned. He calls Skyler, knowing that the police are listening in, and berates her for failing to follow his orders, as a way of clearing her of involvement in his crimes. Walter then goes into hiding, along with Saul, waiting for Ed the "Disappearer" (Robert Forster) to set up a new identity for Walter. A scene in the final Better Call Saul episode, "Saul Gone", shows Walter mocking Saul's legal ability and saying Saul was always a sleazy person; this dovetails with the final Breaking Bad scene between them, where Saul is shown coldly ignoring Walter's empty threats and severing ties between them before leaving for his new life in Omaha, Nebraska. Eventually, Ed helps to set up Walter to live in isolation in New Hampshire.

After several months alone, Walter goes to a local bar, where he calls Walter Jr. and tries to give him money. Walter Jr. angrily rejects the gesture, however, and hangs up. Feeling hopeless, Walter calls the DEA and gives himself up. As he waits for them, however, he sees Gretchen and Elliott on Charlie Rose downplaying his contributions to Gray Matter and resolves to return to Albuquerque to put things right.

When Walter arrives in Albuquerque – on his 52nd birthday – he confronts Gretchen and Elliott at their home and coerces them into putting his remaining money into a trust fund for Walter Jr. He then visits Skyler and provides her with the location of Hank's and Steve's unmarked grave, which he suggests she use to barter for a deal with the prosecutor, and finally admits to her that he entered the meth business for himself, not his family. As a token of appreciation, Skyler lets him see his daughter one last time. Walter then arranges to see Lydia, surreptitiously poisoning her drink with ricin.

Walter drives to Jack's compound and demands to see Jesse. When they bring Jesse, who has been chained up in a lab and forced to cook meth since his abduction, Walter dives atop him and knocks them both to the ground. Now out of range, he activates a remote machine gun mounted in his car that injures Jack and kills all of his men except for Todd, whom Jesse strangles to death with a chain. Jack pleads with Walter to let him live, offering him the rest of his money, but Walter executes him with a gunshot to the face. Walter then asks Jesse to kill him, but Jesse tells him to do it himself. Walter then finds that he has been wounded by a ricocheted bullet.

He answers a call from Lydia on Todd's phone and coldly informs her that she is going to die as a result of the poisoned drink she consumed. He exchanges a knowing nod with Jesse, who escapes the compound. Walter calmly walks around Jack's lab and admires the equipment that Jesse had been using, as well as the perfect batch of his product that Jesse had produced. As the police arrive, Walter collapses to the floor and dies with a smile on his face.

==== El Camino ====
Cranston reprises his role in the sequel film El Camino: A Breaking Bad Movie in a flashback scene, taking place during the events of the episode "4 Days Out" from the show's second season. Walter and Jesse are sitting down at a buffet breakfast talking about how they are going to move a batch of recently cooked meth. Walter asks Jesse what he would like to study if he went to college and encourages Jesse to find a life outside of cooking meth in the future. He suggests that Jesse should study business and marketing, remarking that Jesse has a natural talent and that he "could practically teach the class" himself using his vast knowledge. Afterward, Walter tells Jesse: "You're really lucky, you know that? You didn't have to wait your whole life to do something special."

In the present, Jesse, Skinny Pete, and Badger see various news reports on the aftermath of Walter's massacre. In a news report Jesse listens to, Walter is confirmed to be dead with the same report mentioning an investigation of a Houston woman poisoned by Walter – presumably Lydia – who is in critical condition and not expected to survive.

==== Post–Breaking Bad ====
Walter is briefly mentioned in passing by Saul Goodman, now going by the alias Gene Takavic, as he attempts to explain to Jeff how crazy his life had become and how much money he could earn by getting into "the game".

Francesca Liddy later tells Saul that Walter's death only made things worse for the surviving low-level players connected to his meth empire rather than better. As Walter had hoped, Skyler had succeeded in getting a deal with the federal prosecutors and the DEA was ultimately forced to release Huell Babineaux, leaving only Jesse and Saul for them to go after. Although Jesse has successfully managed to escape to Alaska while tricking the public into thinking he fled to Mexico, the DEA has seized all of Saul's assets and is even following Francesca in an attempt to find him. Francesca admits that she does not know what has become of Patrick Kuby, another one of Walter's associates, and she does not answer Saul's questions about Ira and Danny.

Saul is eventually discovered and interrogated by DEA agents. During their initial questioning, they bring in Marie, who is bitter at Saul for enabling Walter and leading to Hank's death. Saul shrewdly asserts he was also manipulated by Walter to goad the agent to start a plea bargain for a significantly reduced sentence until Saul learns that his involvement with Howard Hamlin's death was already given to them by Kim Wexler.

== Critical reception ==
The character development of Walter White, as well as Bryan Cranston's performance, has received universal acclaim, from both critics and audiences. Walter White is considered to be one of the greatest and most iconic characters in television history.

Paul MacInnes of The Guardian lauded Walter as a whole, noting his quick transformation into becoming Heisenberg. From the same website, Rebecca Nicholson wrote about Walter's death, praising the fact that instead of facing the consequences, "Walter dies happy. He doesn't only get what he deserved; he gets what he wanted. It's the same for us viewers: we get the neatness and the uncertainty, which shows a Heisenberg level of mastery." In their list for the "Top 100 Villains", IGN ranked Walter as #12, stating that "Walter White is selfishness incarnate, and perhaps one of the greatest tragic figures to ever grace television, making his ultimate descent into villainy that much more compelling."

The web magazine Grantland quotes Andy Greenwald as analyzing Walter differently from some others, including Vince Gilligan. Greenwald states:

I've been thinking a lot about Walter White, the "shadow" on his recent CAT scan, and the black cloud that has long since overtaken his heart. The closer we get to the end, the more Walt scrabbles around and lashes out like a rat when it's surrounded, the less I'm buying Vince Gilligan's whole "Mr. Chips to Scarface" quote as an analogy for Walt's transformation... But I think the most horrifying part of Breaking Bad may be that Walt, at his core, didn't really transform at all. It wasn't greed or generosity or cancer or fear that fueled this reign of death and destruction. It was resentment. Every moment Walt spent in front of a classroom he was thinking about how beneath him it all was. He was a genius; he was meant to be a millionaire, not this castrated cross between stepping stone and doormat. When you got down to it, Walt desperately wanted to teach everyone a lesson, and I don't mean in the style of Mr. Chips.

Similarly, Scott Meslow wrote in The Atlantic that Walter's capacity for villainy was present well before the series even began, and that cancer was only the catalyst, stating that "all the elements that have since turned him into a monster were already in place." Emma Rosenblum of New York magazine said Cranston "pulls off the unassuming White with flawless subtlety: a waxy pallor, a slump of the shoulders, and a sense of doom that is palpable". The Hollywood Reporter writer Tim Goodman praised as courageous Vince Gilligan's decision to transform Walter White into an unsympathetic character: "You don't take your main character and make him unlikable. You just don't. Nobody does that. Nobody has ever really done that to this extent." Robert Bianco of USA Today called Walter "one of the greatest dramatic creations ever to grace our TV screens". In 2011, The New York Times named Cranston as one of the "eight actors who turn television into art". Following the show's conclusion, the actor Anthony Hopkins wrote a fan letter to Cranston, in which he praised the show and called Cranston's performance as Walter the best acting he had ever seen.

In 2018, Paul MacInnes of The Guardian wrote: "Despite all the Heisenberg T-shirts and mugs, Walter White didn't endure because of his villainy. If you were still on his side as he died, it was because of the humanity that poked out despite itself. In other words, it wasn't gunning down a load of white supremacists that made him cool, but being unwilling to shoot his long-suffering accomplice Jesse in the aftermath."

=== Accolades ===
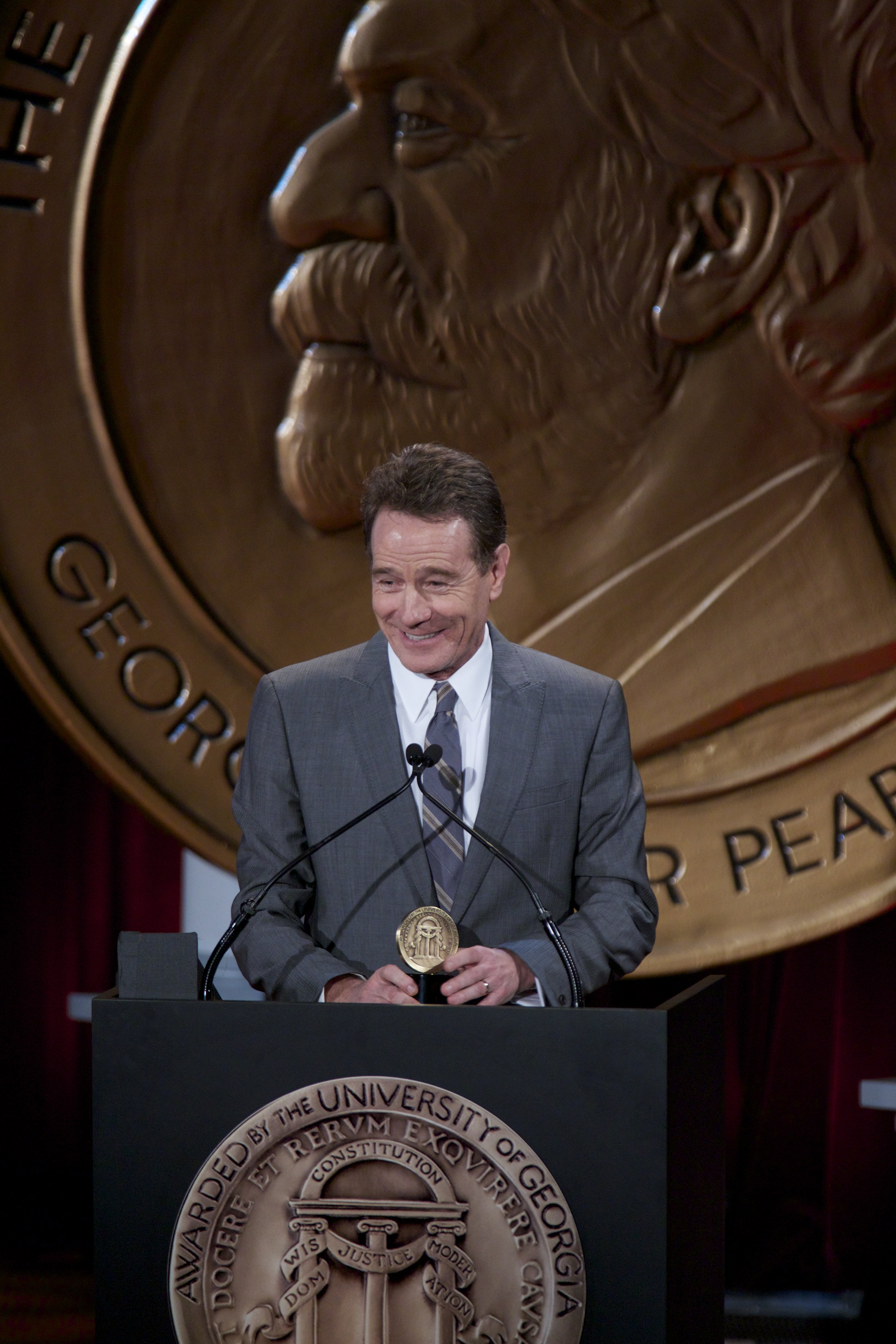
Bryan Cranston accepting the Peabody Award for Breaking Bad at the 73rd Annual Peabody Awards

Cranston has received various awards and nominations for his performance as Walter White. For the first three seasons, he won the Primetime Emmy Award for Outstanding Lead Actor in a Drama Series thrice consecutively, becoming the first actor to accomplish this feat since Bill Cosby for I Spy. Cranston was also nominated in 2012 and 2013 for season four and the first half of season five, but lost out to Damian Lewis for Homeland and Jeff Daniels for The Newsroom, respectively. He also won his fourth Primetime Emmy Award for Outstanding Lead Actor in a Drama Series, at the 66th Primetime Emmy Awards.

At the annual Golden Globe Awards, Cranston has been nominated for the Best Actor – Television Series Drama accolade on four occasions for his role in Breaking Bad, in 2011, 2012, 2013 and 2014, winning in 2014 for the second half of season five. At the Actor Awards, Cranston has been nominated for Male Actor in a Drama Series five times, in 2010, 2011, 2012, 2013 and 2014, winning in 2013 and 2014, for both parts of season five. Additionally, Cranston has been nominated with the rest of the cast for Performance by an Ensemble in a Drama Series, in 2012, 2013 and 2014, winning only in 2014.

In addition, Cranston has won the Satellite Award for Best Actor: Drama Series three times consecutively, in 2008, 2009 and 2010, for seasons one, two and three, and has been nominated in 2011, 2012 and 2014 for seasons four and five. He won the TCA Award for Individual Achievement in Drama in 2009, and was nominated in 2010, 2012 and 2013; was nominated twice for the Prism Award for Best Performance in a Drama Series Multi-Episode Storyline; won two Saturn Awards for Best Actor on Television in 2012 and 2013 (tying with Kevin Bacon for The Following on the latter occasion), and was nominated in 2009, 2010 and 2011; and won the Golden Nymph Award for Outstanding Actor in a Drama Series in 2013.

== Cultural impact and legacy ==
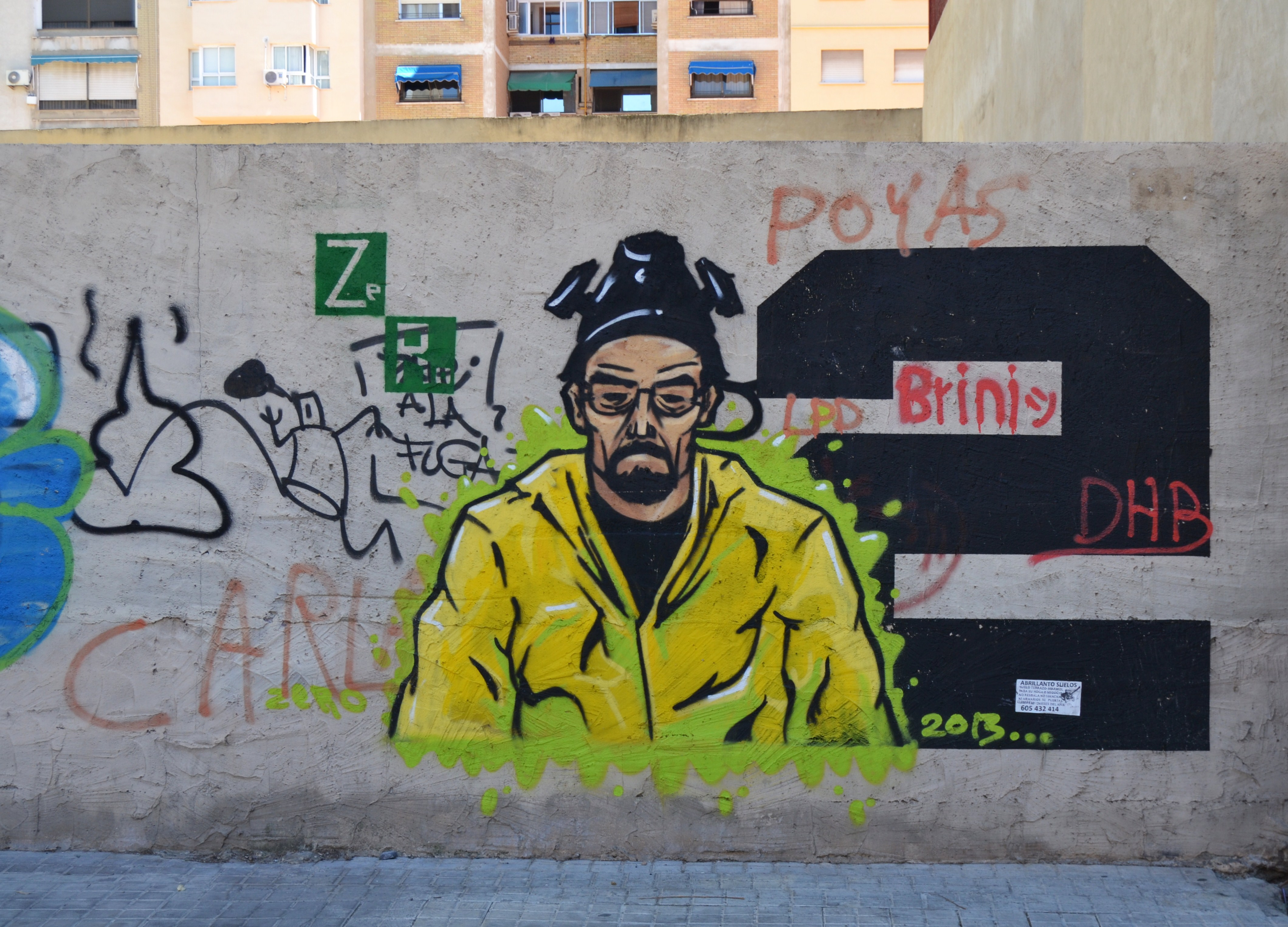
Walter White graffiti in Carrer d'Antoni Suárez, Valencia, Spain

Over time Walter developed a cult following, spawning fan websites like "Heisenberg Labs", "Walt's Wardrobe", and "Save Walter White", which is an exact replica of the website Walter's son creates in the series to raise money to pay for his father's cancer treatments. In 2015, the series' creator, Vince Gilligan, publicly requested fans of the series to stop reenacting a scene in which Walter angrily throws a pizza on his roof after Skyler refuses to let him inside; this came after complaints from the home's real-world owner.

Many fans of Breaking Bad, including the actor Norm Macdonald and the New York magazine writer Emily Nussbaum, proposed a theory, in which most of the series finale happened in Walter's mind, and he really died in the stolen Volvo in the beginning of it. While Nussbaum merely stated that it would be her preferred ending, Macdonald emphasized the seemingly unreal scenarios of Walt's final day, as well as what he deemed as unreliable acting. However, Gilligan debunked this theory, explaining that Walter could not possibly have known several things that happened, like Jesse being held in captivity by Jack's gang instead of being murdered by them, or that Todd had begun taking meetings with Lydia regarding the meth trade. This theory was further disproven with Better Call Saul following Saul's story before and after Breaking Bad alongside El Camino: A Breaking Bad Movie following Jesse's story after the finale, in which Walter is confirmed to have died.

Cranston reprised his role in a commercial for Esurance which aired during Super Bowl XLIX, one week before the premiere of Better Call Saul. In December 2016, Bryan cameoed as Walter in an episode of Saturday Night Live in the cold open. The skit had Walter on a CNN broadcast where he is the front runner for Donald Trump's cabinet nominee for the Drug Enforcement Administration. In 2023, Cranston again reprised his role in an advertisement for the snack brand PopCorners during Super Bowl LVII. In the Spanish-language remake of Breaking Bad, titled Metástasis, his character is renamed Walter Blanco (blanco being the Spanish translation of white) and is portrayed by Diego Trujillo. In 2024, he also appears in an anti-littering advertisement.

Bronze statues of Walter and Jesse were commissioned and donated by Gilligan and Sony Pictures Television to Albuquerque in July 2022. They are housed in the Albuquerque Convention Center. They were made by the sculptor Trevor Grove.

A Breaking Bad fan group placed a paid obituary for Walter in the Albuquerque Journal on October 4, 2013. On October 19, 2013, the actor Jackamoe Buzzell organized a mock funeral procession (including a hearse and a replica of Walter's meth lab RV) and service for the character was held at Albuquerque's Sunset Memorial Park cemetery. A headstone was placed with a photo of Cranston as Walter, located on an outside wall in Los Ranchos de Albuquerque, New Mexico. While some residents were unhappy with the makeshift grave-site for closure with the show, tickets for the event raised over $30,000 for a local charity called Albuquerque Healthcare for the Homeless.

In 2021, a new species of stygobiotic freshwater snail in the genus Spiralix was described from eastern Spain, and was named Spiralix heisenbergi after Walter and his alias.

In March 2025, a 22-year-old chemistry major and fan of the series who was allegedly inspired by Walter White's character was arrested and charged with drug manufacturing by law enforcement in Italy. It was said that he was found with a meth manufacturing setup similar to the one seen in the series. Other substances found in his possession included MDMA, DMT and LSD.

== See also ==
- List of characters in the Breaking Bad franchise
