= Breaking Bad =

American crime drama TV series

- Genre: Crime drama; Thriller; Neo-Western; Black comedy; Tragedy
- Created by: Vince Gilligan
- Showrunner: Vince Gilligan
- Starring: Bryan Cranston; Anna Gunn; Aaron Paul; Dean Norris; Betsy Brandt; RJ Mitte; Giancarlo Esposito; Bob Odenkirk; Jonathan Banks; Laura Fraser; Jesse Plemons
- Composer: Dave Porter
- Country of origin: United States
- Original languages: English; Spanish
- No. of seasons: 5
- No. of episodes: 62 (list of episodes)

Production
- Executive producers: Vince Gilligan; Mark Johnson; Michelle MacLaren
- Producers: Stewart A. Lyons; Sam Catlin; John Shiban; Peter Gould; George Mastras; Thomas Schnauz; Melissa Bernstein; Diane Mercer; Bryan Cranston; Moira Walley-Beckett; Karen Moore; Patty Lin
- Production locations: Albuquerque Studios, Albuquerque, New Mexico
- Cinematography: Michael Slovis; Reynaldo Villalobos; Arthur Albert; John Toll; Nelson Cragg; Marshall Adams
- Editors: Kelley Dixon; Skip Macdonald; Chris McCaleb; Sharidan Williams-Sotelo; Lynne Willingham
- Running time: 43–58 minutes
- Production companies: High Bridge Entertainment; Gran Via Productions; Sony Pictures Television
- Budget: $3–6 million per episode

Original release
- Network: AMC
- Release: January 20, 2008 – September 29, 2013

Related
- Talking Bad; Metástasis; Better Call Saul; El Camino: A Breaking Bad Movie

Breaking Bad is an American neo-Western crime drama television series created by Vince Gilligan for AMC. Set and filmed in Albuquerque, New Mexico, the series follows Walter White (Bryan Cranston), an overqualified high school chemistry teacher who, after being diagnosed with stage-three lung cancer, begins producing and selling methamphetamine with former student Jesse Pinkman (Aaron Paul) to secure his family's financial future. The series also stars Anna Gunn, Dean Norris, Betsy Brandt, RJ Mitte, Giancarlo Esposito, Bob Odenkirk, Jonathan Banks, Laura Fraser, and Jesse Plemons.

Breaking Bad premiered on AMC on January 20, 2008, and concluded on September 29, 2013, after five seasons and 62 episodes. Its first season received generally positive reviews, while later seasons, especially the fifth and final season, received widespread critical acclaim for the performances, writing, direction, cinematography, and character development. The series had modest viewership during its first three seasons, before viewership increased after it became available on Netflix prior to the fourth season. Viewership rose further during the second half of the final season in 2013, and the series finale became one of the most watched cable television episodes of its era.

Since its conclusion, Breaking Bad has been widely regarded by critics as one of the greatest television series of all time. It received numerous accolades, including 16 Primetime Emmy Awards, 2 Golden Globe Awards, 2 Peabody Awards, and a British Academy Television Award. Cranston won the Primetime Emmy Award for Outstanding Lead Actor in a Drama Series four times, Paul won the Primetime Emmy Award for Outstanding Supporting Actor in a Drama Series three times, and Gunn won the Primetime Emmy Award for Outstanding Supporting Actress in a Drama Series twice. The series has continued to appear in retrospective rankings of the best television programs.

The series gave rise to the larger Breaking Bad franchise. Better Call Saul, a spin-off series centered on Odenkirk's character Saul Goodman, debuted on AMC on February 8, 2015, and concluded on August 15, 2022. El Camino: A Breaking Bad Movie, a sequel film starring Paul, was released on Netflix and in selected theaters on October 11, 2019.

== Premise ==
Breaking Bad follows Walter White, a financially struggling high school chemistry teacher and part-time car wash employee from Albuquerque, New Mexico, who enters the local methamphetamine trade after being diagnosed with stage-three lung cancer. Seeking to secure his family's financial future, Walter begins producing methamphetamine with his former student Jesse Pinkman in a rolling meth lab. Their operation gradually expands as they produce a highly pure form of blue methamphetamine that becomes widely sought after. Walter adopts the alias "Heisenberg" to conceal his identity. His involvement in the drug trade brings him into conflict with his family, the Drug Enforcement Administration (DEA) through his brother-in-law Hank Schrader, local gangs, regional distributors, and Mexican drug cartels, placing him and his family at risk. The events of the series take place between 2008 and 2010.

== Cast and characters ==
=== Main characters ===
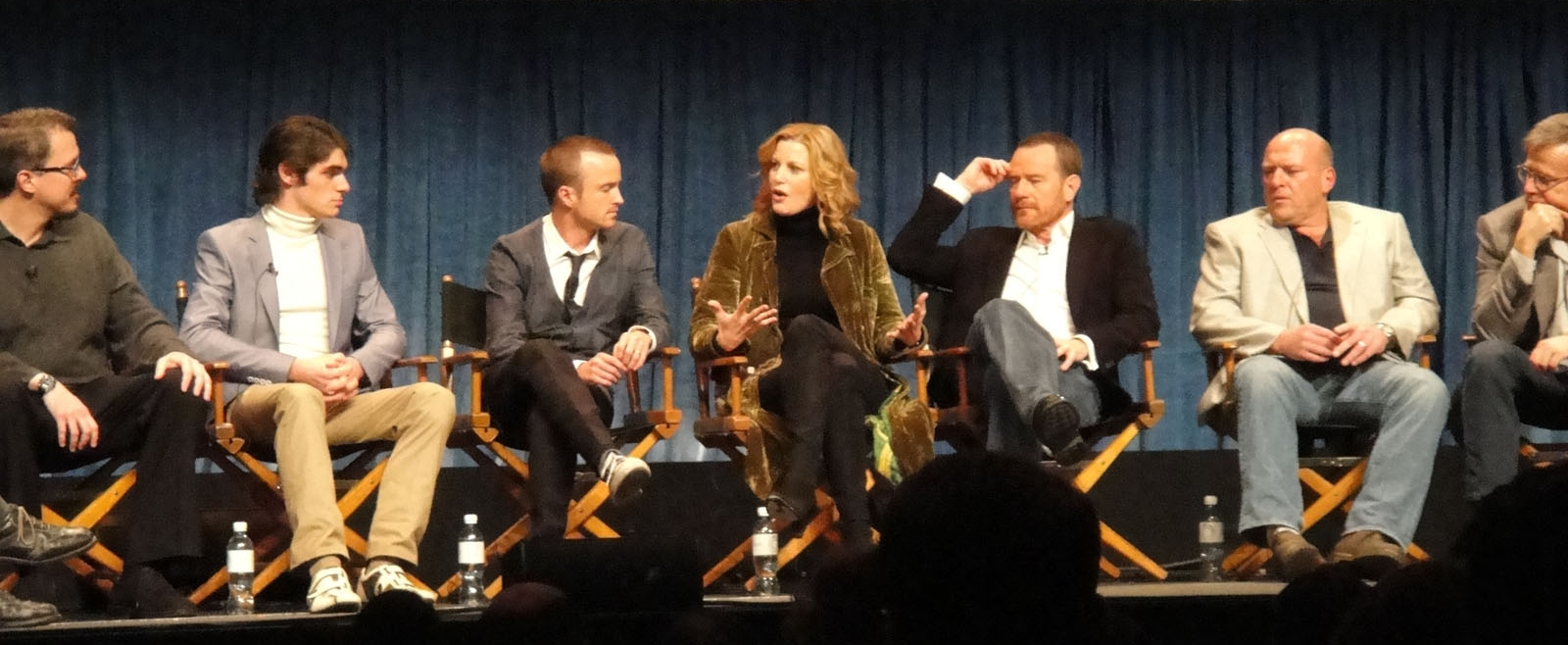
Breaking Bad cast and crew (left to right): creator Vince Gilligan, RJ Mitte (Walter White Jr.), Aaron Paul (Jesse Pinkman), Anna Gunn (Skyler White), Bryan Cranston (Walter White), Dean Norris (Hank Schrader), and producer Mark Johnson

- Bryan Cranston as Walter White, a high-school chemistry teacher who, shortly after his 50th birthday, is diagnosed with stage III lung cancer and begins producing methamphetamine to secure his family's finances. As his drug operation expands, Walter gains a notorious reputation under the alias "Heisenberg". Cranston said he was interested in moving from comedy toward drama, while recognizing that dramatic roles could still include moments of comedy.
- Anna Gunn as Skyler White, Walter's wife, who is pregnant with their second child before his diagnosis and becomes increasingly suspicious of his behavior. Gunn described Skyler as "grounded, tough, smart and driven", and said the character's stalled writing career reflected her desire to be creative and productive.
- Aaron Paul as Jesse Pinkman, Walter's former student and partner in the methamphetamine trade. Paul described Jesse as a lost young man rather than a bad person, and compared Jesse and Walter's relationship to The Odd Couple.
- Dean Norris as Hank Schrader, Walter and Skyler's brother-in-law and a DEA agent investigating the local methamphetamine trade. At the beginning of the series, Hank was intended to serve as comic relief.
- Betsy Brandt as Marie Schrader, Skyler's sister and Hank's wife, who is characterized by her loyalty to her family and her recurring kleptomania. Brandt said that although Marie could be unpleasant, the character had greater depth through her concern for her family.
- RJ Mitte as Walter White Jr., Walter and Skyler's son, who has cerebral palsy. Mitte also had cerebral palsy, although a milder form, and said he adjusted his speech and movement to portray the character.
- Giancarlo Esposito as Gustavo "Gus" Fring (seasons 3–4; guest season 2), a drug distributor who publicly owns the fast-food chain Los Pollos Hermanos. Esposito said he incorporated his yoga training into his performance to give Gus a controlled and composed physical presence.
- Bob Odenkirk as Saul Goodman (seasons 3–5; recurring season 2), a criminal lawyer who represents Walter and Jesse. Odenkirk drew inspiration for Saul Goodman's vocal delivery from film producer Robert Evans.
- Jonathan Banks as Mike Ehrmantraut (seasons 3–5; guest season 2), a fixer, private investigator, and hitman who works for Gus and Saul. Banks said he avoided closely modeling Mike on Harvey Keitel's Winston Wolfe character from Pulp Fiction, despite comparisons between the two cleaner roles.
- Laura Fraser as Lydia Rodarte-Quayle (season 5), a Madrigal Electromotive executive and former associate of Gus Fring who supplies Walter and Jesse with methylamine and helps Walter expand his operation overseas.
- Jesse Plemons as Todd Alquist (season 5), a Vamonos Pest Control employee who becomes an associate of Walter and Jesse.

=== Recurring characters ===
- Steven Michael Quezada as Steven "Gomey" Gómez (seasons 1–5), Hank's DEA partner and best friend.
- Matt Jones as Brandon "Badger" Mayhew (seasons 1–5), one of Jesse's friends and associates.
- Charles Baker as Skinny Pete (seasons 1–5), one of Jesse's friends and associates.
- Rodney Rush as Christian "Combo" Ortega (seasons 1–3), one of Jesse's friends and associates.
- Jessica Hecht and Adam Godley as Gretchen and Elliott Schwartz (seasons 1, 2 and 5), co-owners of Gray Matter Technologies, a company co-founded by Walter before the events of the series.
- Raymond Cruz as Tuco Salamanca (seasons 1–2), a volatile drug distributor who becomes involved with Walter and Jesse.
- Mark Margolis as Héctor Salamanca (seasons 2–4), a former high-ranking member of the Juárez Cartel and the uncle of Tuco, Marco, and Leonel Salamanca.
- Christopher Cousins as Ted Beneke (seasons 2–5), Skyler's boss and the president of Beneke Fabricators.
- Krysten Ritter as Jane Margolis (seasons 2–3), Jesse's apartment manager and girlfriend.
- David Costabile as Gale Boetticher (seasons 3–4), a chemist hired by Gus Fring to work with Walter.
- Daniel Moncada and Luis Moncada as Leonel and Marco Salamanca (season 3), twin cartel enforcers and nephews of Hector Salamanca.
- Javier Grajeda as Juan Bolsa (seasons 3–4), a high-ranking member of the Juárez Cartel and mediator between the Salamancas and Gus Fring.
- Emily Rios as Andrea Cantillo (seasons 3–5), Jesse's girlfriend and the mother of Brock Cantillo.
- Lavell Crawford as Huell Babineaux (seasons 4–5), Saul Goodman's bodyguard.
- Bill Burr as Patrick Kuby (seasons 4–5), one of Saul Goodman's hired associates.
- Michael Bowen as Jack Welker (season 5), Todd's uncle and the leader of a white supremacist gang.

== Production ==
=== Conception ===
Breaking Bad was created by Vince Gilligan, who had spent several years writing the Fox series The X-Files. Gilligan wanted to create a series in which the protagonist became the antagonist. "Television is historically good at keeping its characters in a self-imposed stasis so that shows can go on for years or even decades", he said. "When I realized this, the logical next step was to think, how can I do a show in which the fundamental drive is toward change?" He added that his goal with Walter White was to turn him from Mr. Chips into Scarface. Gilligan believed the concept of showing the full drastic transformation of a character across the run of a television show was a risky concept and would be difficult to pitch without other powerful factors to support it, such as strong cinematography and acting.

The show's title is a Southern colloquialism meaning, among other things, "raising hell", and was chosen by Gilligan to describe Walter's transformation. According to Time entertainment editor Lily Rothman, the term has a broader meaning and is an old phrase which "connotes more violence than 'raising hell' does ... [T]he words possess a wide variety of nuances: to 'break bad' can mean to 'go wild', to 'defy authority', and break the law, to be verbally 'combative, belligerent, or threatening' or, followed by the preposition 'on', 'to dominate or humiliate'."

The concept emerged as Gilligan talked with his fellow X-Files writer Thomas Schnauz regarding their current unemployment and joked that the solution was for them to put a "meth lab in the back of an RV and [drive] around the country cooking meth and making money".

After writing the concept for the show and pilot, Gilligan pitched it to Sony Pictures Television, who became very interested in supporting it. Sony arranged for meetings with the various cable networks. Showtime passed on this, as they had already started broadcasting Weeds, a show with similarities to the premise of Breaking Bad. While his producers convinced him that the show was different enough to still be successful, Gilligan later stated that he would not have gone forward with the idea had he known about Weeds earlier. Other networks like HBO and TNT also passed on the idea, but eventually FX took interest and began initial discussions on producing the pilot. At the same time, FX had also started development of Dirt, a female-centric crime-based drama series, and with three existing male-centric shows already on the network, FX passed up Breaking Bad for Dirt.

One of Gilligan's agents spoke to Jeremy Elice, the director of original programming for AMC who was looking for more original shows to add alongside their upcoming Mad Men. Elice was intrigued, and soon a meeting was set up between Gilligan, Elice, and two programming executives. Gilligan was not optimistic about this meeting, fearing they would just put him off, but instead all three showed great interest, and the meeting ended up establishing how AMC would acquire the rights from FX and set the pilot into production. It took about a year following this meeting before Sony had set up the rights with AMC and production could start.

=== Development history ===
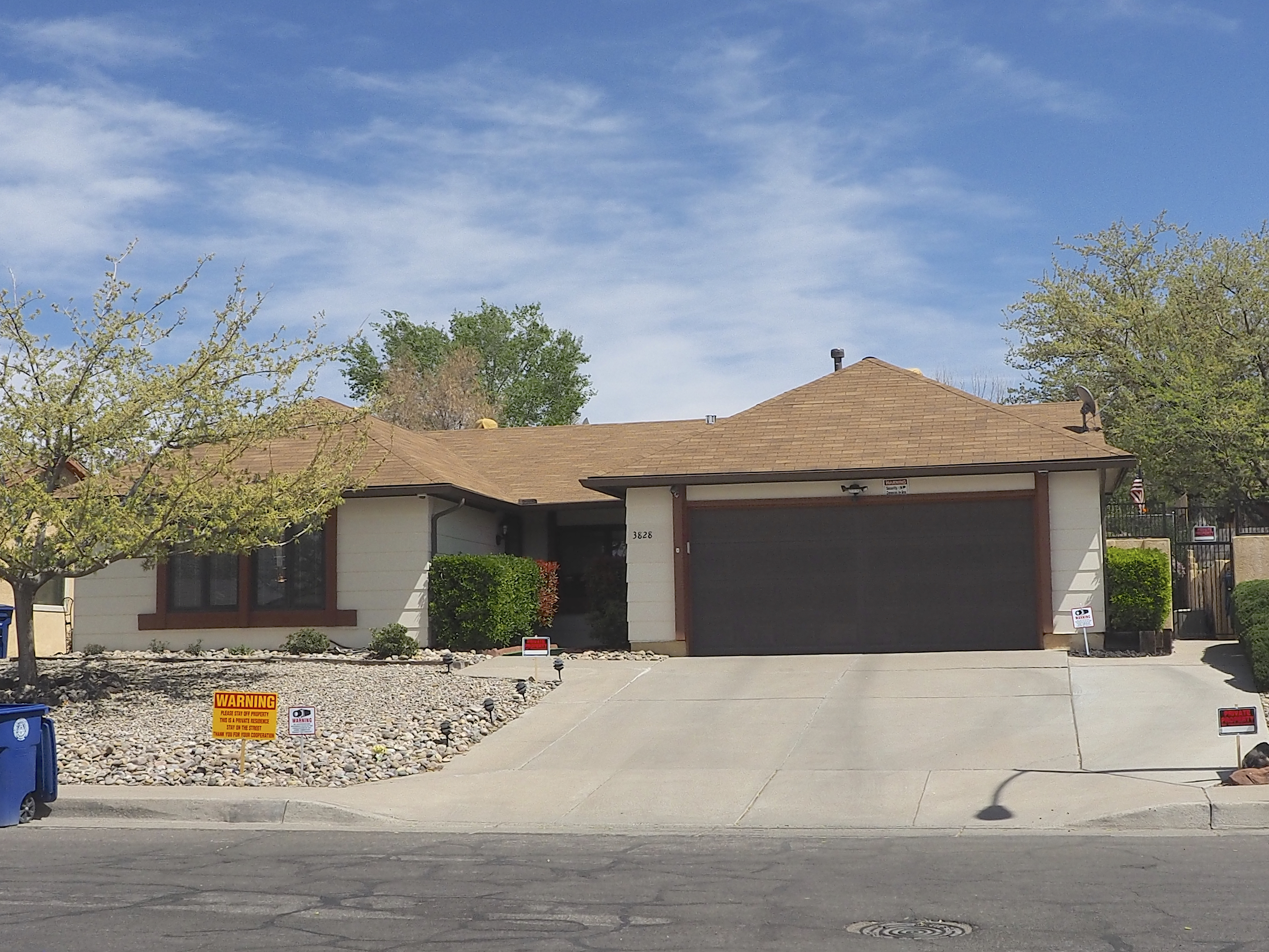
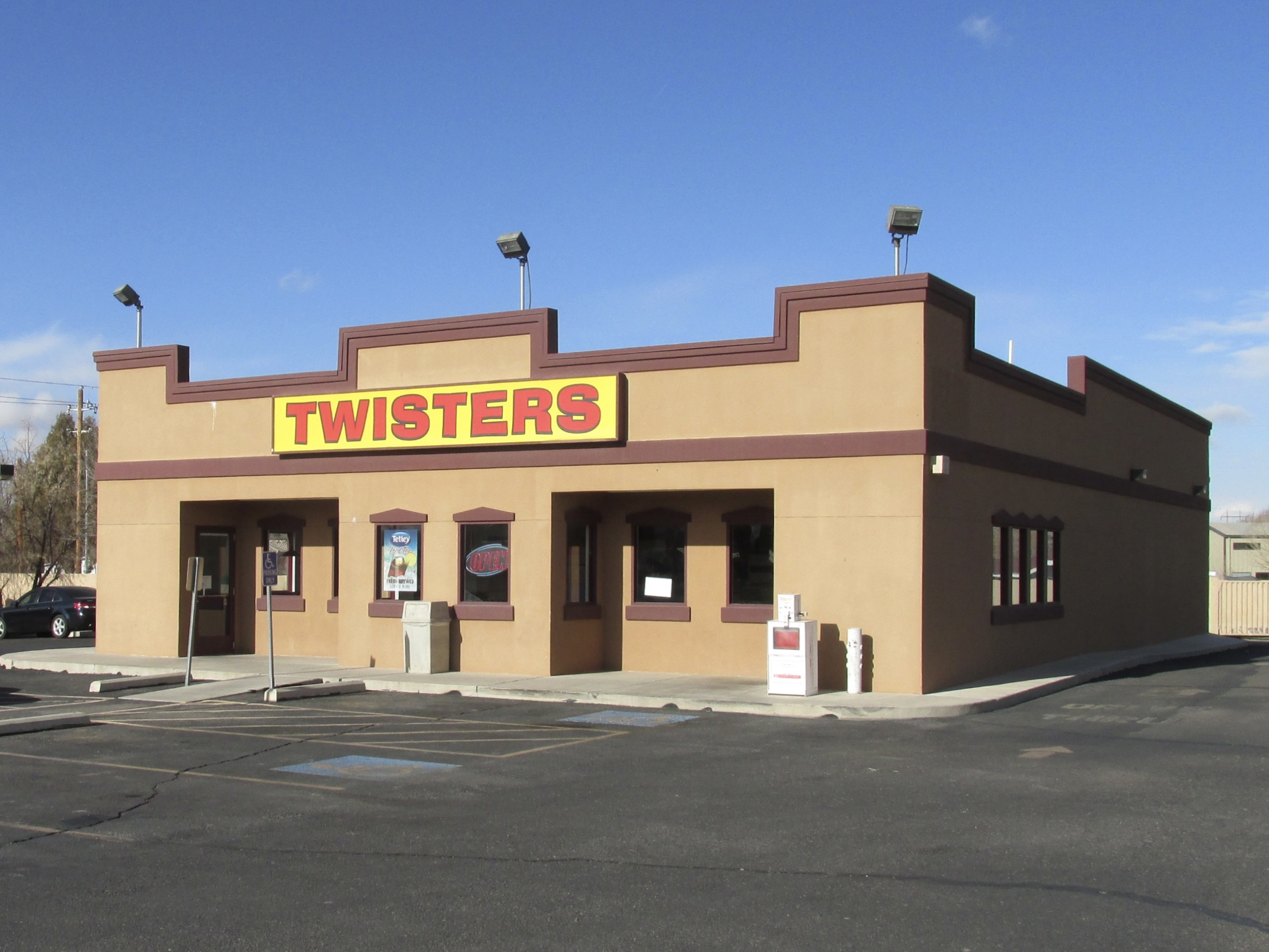
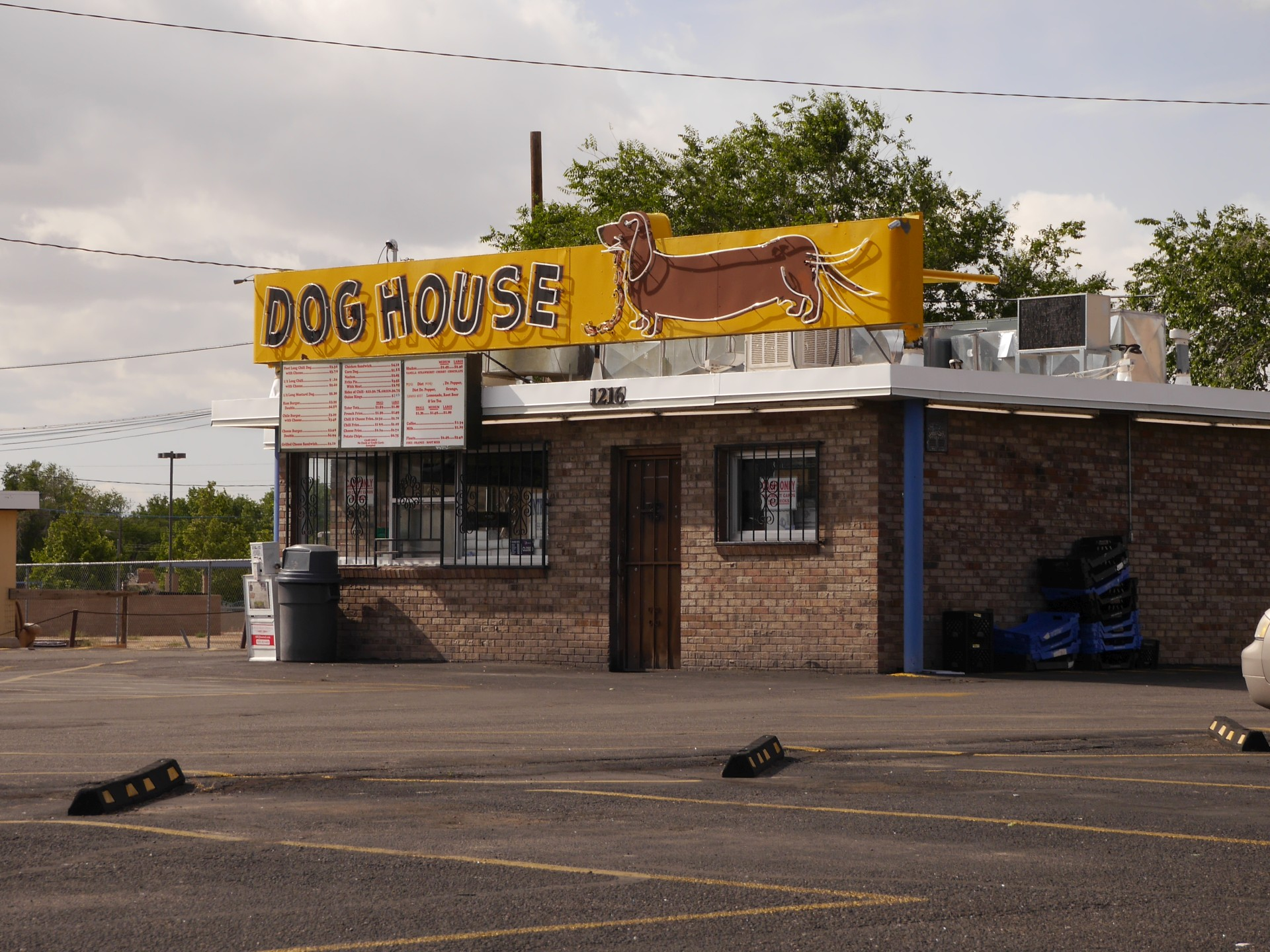
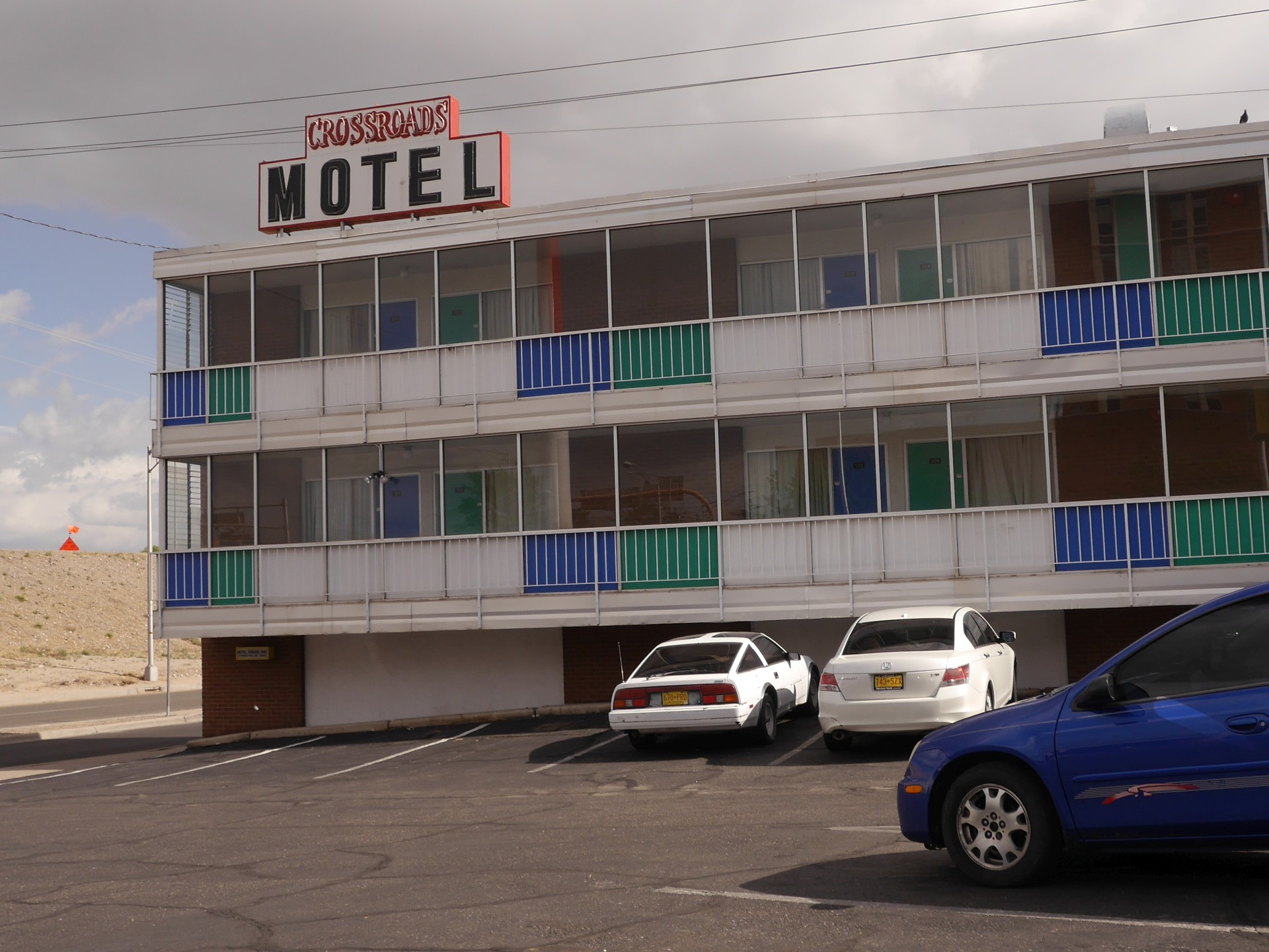
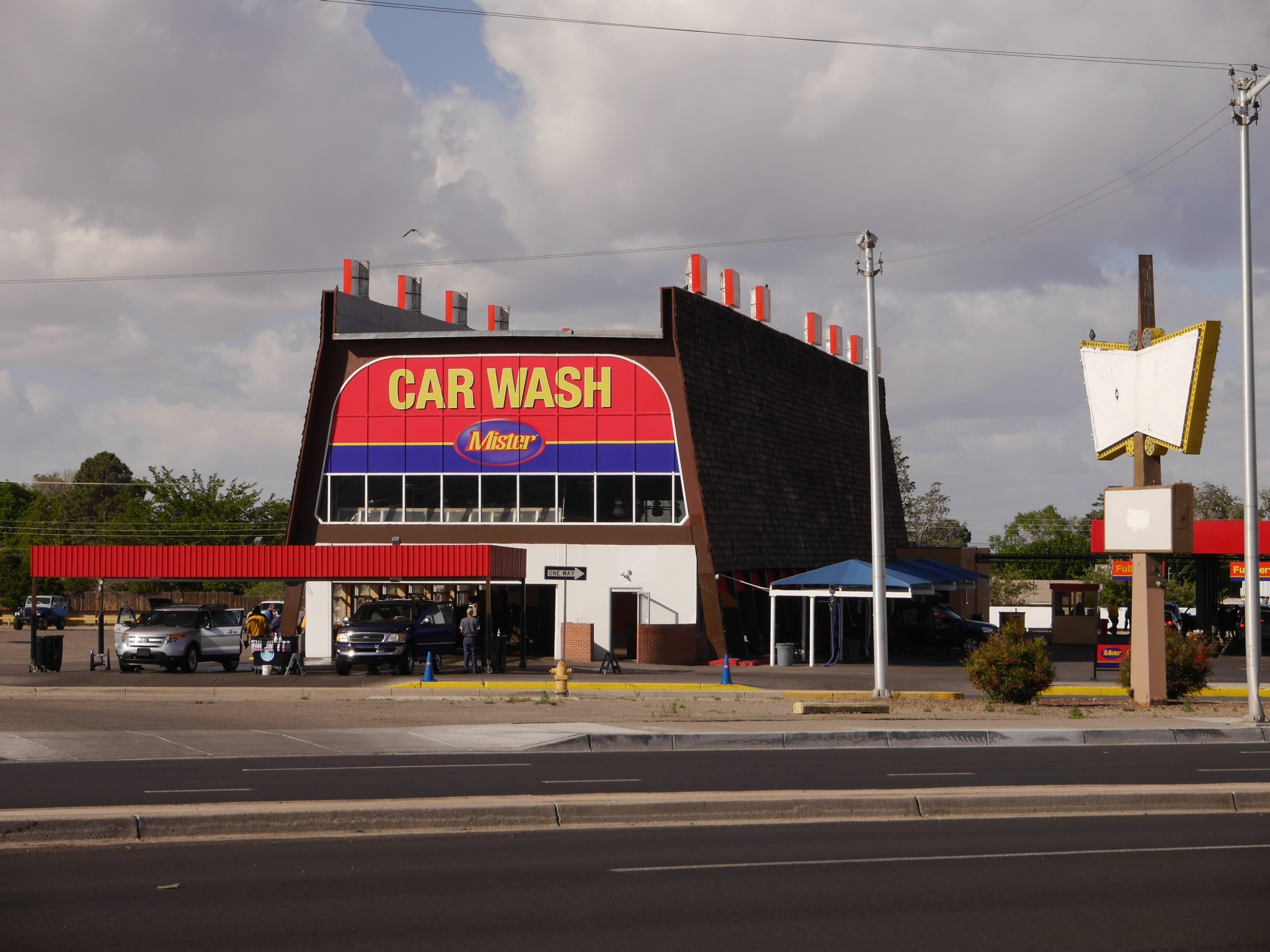
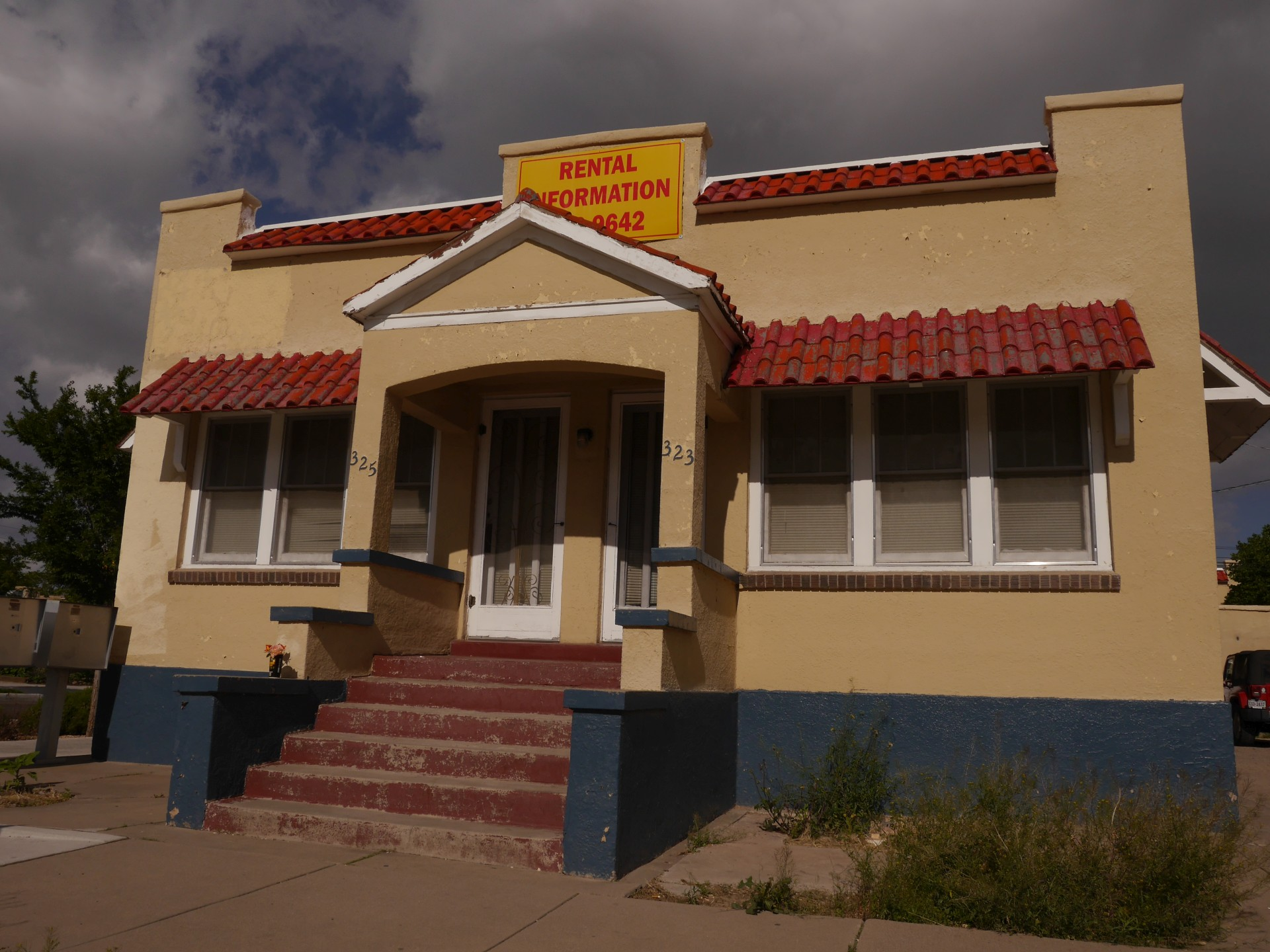
Breaking Bad was filmed at various locations across Albuquerque. Clockwise from top left: the house used for the Whites' home; the fast food restaurant that was used for Los Pollos Hermanos; the Crossroads Motels used in-show for various drug deals; a rental home used for Jane's and Jesse's apartment; the car wash where Walter works part-time; and the Doghouse, a functioning drive-in restaurant.

The network ordered nine episodes for the first season (including the pilot), but the 2007–08 Writers Guild of America strike limited the production to seven episodes, as well as delayed the start of production for the second season. Within the original nine-episode arc, Gilligan had planned to kill off Jesse or Hank, as a "ballsy" moment to end the season on. This death was eliminated with the limited episode count, which Gilligan found to be a net positive given the strength of acting that both Paul and Norris brought to these roles through the seasons. The strike also helped to slow down production long enough for Gilligan and his writing team to readjust the pacing of the show, which in the original arc had been moving too quickly. Gould stated that the writer's strike "saved the show", as had they produced the two additional episodes in the first season, they would have gone down a different creative path that he believes would have led to the show's cancellation by its third season.

The initial versions of the script were set in Riverside, California, but at the suggestion of Sony, Albuquerque was chosen for the production's location due to the favorable financial conditions offered by the state of New Mexico. Once Gilligan recognized that this would mean "we'd always have to be avoiding the Sandia Mountains" in shots directed toward the east, the story setting was changed to the actual production location. Filming would primarily take place in Albuquerque Studios. It was shot primarily on 35 mm film, with digital cameras employed as needed for additional angles, point of view shots and time-lapse photography. Early episodes cost about $3 million each to produce, higher than the average cost for a basic cable program.

Around 2010, AMC had expressed to Sony Pictures Television and Gilligan that they felt that the third season would be the last for Breaking Bad. Sony started to shop the show around, having gained quick interest from the FX network for two more seasons, upon which AMC changed its mind and allowed the show to continue. At the same time, Netflix was starting to shop for content to add to its service and arranged a deal with Sony for Breaking Bad to be available after the airing of the fourth season. Knowing that AMC had placed Breaking Bad on a potential cancellation route, Sony pushed to have the show added to the service in time for the fourth season. Breaking Bad's viewership grew greatly as viewers binged the series on Netflix, helping to assure that a fifth season could be made. The fifth-season premiere had more than double the viewership compared to the fourth season premiere, attributed to the Netflix availability. Gilligan thanked Netflix at the Emmy Awards in September 2013 after the series's conclusion for the popularity of the series, saying that Netflix "kept us on the air".

As the series progressed, Gilligan and the writing staff of Breaking Bad made Walter increasingly unsympathetic. Gilligan said during the run of the series, "He's going from being a protagonist to an antagonist. We want to make people question who they're pulling for, and why." Cranston said by the fourth season, "I think Walt's figured out it's better to be a pursuer than the pursued. He's well on his way to badass."

In July 2011, Gilligan indicated that he intended to conclude Breaking Bad at the end of its fifth season. In early August 2011, negotiations began over a deal regarding the fifth and possible final season between the network AMC and Sony Pictures Television, the production company of the series. AMC proposed a shortened fifth season (six to eight episodes, instead of 13) to cut costs, but the producers declined. Sony then approached other cable networks about possibly picking up the show if a deal could not be made. On August 14, 2011, AMC renewed the series for a fifth and final season consisting of 16 episodes. In April 2012, Cranston revealed that the fifth season would be split into two halves, with the first eight episodes airing in 2012, and the final eight in 2013.

Before the series finale, Gilligan said that it was difficult to write for Walter White because the character was so dark and morally questionable: "I'm going to miss the show when it's over, but on some level, it'll be a relief to not have Walt in my head anymore." Gilligan later said the idea for Walter's character intrigued him so much that he "didn't really give much thought on how well it would sell", stating that he would have given up on the premise since it was "such an odd, dark story" that could have difficulties being pitched to studios. Ultimately, Gilligan chose to end Breaking Bad with Walter's death, occurring in-story two years after he had first been diagnosed with cancer and given two years to live. Gilligan said by the end of the series, "it feels as if we should adhere to our promise that we explicitly made to our audience" from the first episode.

=== Writing ===
Gilligan served as showrunner and led a collaborative writers' room. Brett Martin observed the writers' room during production of the fourth season and described Gilligan as balancing close creative control with an open, collaborative style. The room included Thomas Schnauz, Gennifer Hutchison, Moira Walley-Beckett, Sam Catlin, Peter Gould, and George Mastras, with story points arranged on index cards across a season board. The writers also used maps of New Mexico and Albuquerque and a schematic of Walter's fictional superlab while developing story material.

Gould said the writers' room usually consisted of six writers and Gilligan, who worked together on weekdays to break stories. He described the process as additive rather than competitive, with writers building on one another's ideas until a scene or plot turn developed into a usable story point. Gould also said the series' writers remained involved after scripts were completed, including during preparation, casting sessions, prop meetings, tone meetings with directors and producers, filming, editing, and sound work.

The writers did not always plan every plot resolution in advance. Gilligan said the final season's flash-forward to Walter buying a machine gun began with an image that interested the writers, before they had determined its exact payoff. He said the writers had broad ideas about how the moment might resolve, but spent weeks or months working out the details. In a later interview, Gilligan said the writers intentionally avoided a fixed roadmap for much of Breaking Bad and Better Call Saul, instead allowing character behavior to guide later story turns.

=== Casting ===
You're going to see that underlying humanity, even when he's making the most devious, terrible decisions, and you need someone who has that humanity – deep down, bedrock humanity – so you say, watching this show, "All right, I'll go for this ride. I don't like what he's doing, but I understand, and I'll go with it for as far as it goes." If you don't have a guy who gives you that, despite the greatest acting chops in the world, the show is not going to succeed.

— Vince Gilligan, about Bryan Cranston

Breaking Bad creator Vince Gilligan cast Bryan Cranston for the role of Walter White based on having worked with him in the "Drive" episode of the science fiction television series The X-Files, on which Gilligan worked as a writer. Cranston played an anti-Semite with a terminal illness who took series co-protagonist Fox Mulder (David Duchovny) hostage. Gilligan said Walter had to remain both loathsome and sympathetic, and believed Cranston could maintain that balance. AMC officials, who were initially reluctant with the casting choice, having known Cranston only as the over-the-top character Hal on the comedy series Malcolm in the Middle, approached actors John Cusack and Matthew Broderick about the role. When both actors declined, the executives were persuaded to cast Cranston after seeing his X-Files episode.

Cranston contributed significantly to the formation and development of the Walter White persona. When Gilligan left much of Walter's past unexplained during the development of the series, the actor wrote his own backstory for the character. At the start of the show, Cranston gained 10 pounds to reflect the character's personal decline, and had the natural red highlights of his hair dyed brown. He collaborated with costume designer Kathleen Detoro on a wardrobe of mostly neutral green and brown colors to make the character bland and unremarkable, and worked with makeup artist Frieda Valenzuela to create a mustache he described as "impotent" and like a "dead caterpillar". Cranston repeatedly identified elements in certain scripts where he disagreed with how the character was handled, and went so far as to call Gilligan directly when he could not work out disagreements with the episode's screenwriters. Cranston has said he was inspired partially by his elderly father for how Walter carries himself physically, which he described as "a little hunched over, never erect, [as if] the weight of the world is on this man's shoulders". In contrast to his character, Cranston has been described as extremely playful on set, with Aaron Paul describing him as "a kid trapped in a man's body".

Aaron Paul's casting was also initially questioned by production, as Paul looked too old and too much of a "pretty boy" to be associated with meth cooking. Gilligan reconsidered Paul's skills after seeing his audition and recalling that he had also guest-starred on The X-Files episode "Lord of the Flies". Gilligan originally intended for Pinkman to be killed at the end of Breaking Bad's first season in a botched drug deal as a plot device to plague Walter White with guilt. However, Gilligan said by the second episode of the season, he was so impressed with Paul's performance that "it became pretty clear early on that that would be a huge, colossal mistake, to kill off Jesse". Similarly, Dean Norris had shown his ability to be a law enforcement official in The X-Files episode "F. Emasculata", and was brought on to be Hank Schrader, Walter's brother-in-law and DEA agent.

Other cast members later described performance choices that shaped their characters. Anna Gunn described Skyler White as "grounded, tough, smart and driven", and said the character's stalled writing career reflected her desire to be creative and productive. RJ Mitte, who had a milder form of cerebral palsy than Walter White Jr., said he learned to walk on crutches and slowed his speech for the role. Giancarlo Esposito said his ashtanga yoga and meditation practice helped him create Gus Fring's controlled, methodical physical presence.

Bob Odenkirk said he was offered the role of Saul Goodman during the second season, when the character was planned for the final four episodes. Odenkirk contributed Saul's comb-over hairstyle and drew on Hollywood agents and film producer Robert Evans for the character's fast-talking delivery. An oral history of Saul Goodman later described the character as initially uncertain in long-term importance, before Odenkirk's performance and the writers' development of the role led to the creation of Better Call Saul. Jonathan Banks said he avoided closely modeling Mike Ehrmantraut on Harvey Keitel's Winston Wolfe character from Pulp Fiction, despite comparisons between the two cleaner roles.

=== Music ===
Dave Porter composed the original score and main title theme for Breaking Bad. Porter became involved with the series through music supervisor Thomas Golubić, who was preparing for a meeting with Gilligan and the producers while the pilot was being developed. Porter supplied temporary music during the pilot process and was later hired as composer after Gilligan and the producers responded to his work. Golubić said Porter helped build the sound of the series and that the title theme developed through several drafts before the production settled on its final version.

Porter said his goal was to create a score that reflected the particular world of the series rather than using a conventional orchestral approach. He avoided traditional Western orchestral instrumentation and instead used ethnic instruments, found sounds, field recordings, vintage and modern synthesizers, and electric guitar. The score was recorded and processed digitally, allowing sounds to be altered into new textures. Porter described the score as a unifying element for a series that moved between drama, suspense, black comedy, and violence.

The score also reflected the series' Western influence. Porter said the instrumentation was not generally Western, apart from the resonator guitar used in the main title theme, but that the music shared an aesthetic with classic Western scores. He connected this to Gilligan's references to the use of sound in films such as Once Upon a Time in the West, as well as to sparse orchestration, short solo motifs, deliberate tempos, and the desert landscape. Porter also said that the production often avoided music during dialogue-heavy scenes and major revelations, allowing the writing and acting to carry those moments. He treated the end credits as part of the storytelling process, discussing with Gilligan what emotion the audience should be left with after each episode.

Golubić supervised the use of licensed music in the series. He described music supervision as a storytelling process and said Breaking Bad allowed for unusually obscure and exploratory song choices. Budget limitations also affected the process, sometimes pushing the music team toward less obvious selections. Golubić cited TV on the Radio's "DLZ", used during Walter's confrontation with another methamphetamine dealer, as a song choice that helped mark a turning point in Walter's transformation. He also said that Gilligan selected Badfinger's "Baby Blue" for the final scene of the series after thinking of the song while writing the finale. The New Yorker later described the song as thematically tied to Walter's attachment to his methamphetamine operation and noted that the series often used popular music as a plot device or clue rather than merely as background music.

Several soundtrack albums were released for the series. Breaking Bad: Music from the Original Television Series included Porter's main title theme alongside licensed songs used in the show. In 2012, Madison Gate Records released Breaking Bad: Original Score from the Television Series, a 20-track album of Porter's score from the series.

=== Scientific accuracy ===
Donna Nelson, a professor of organic chemistry at the University of Oklahoma, checked scripts, helped prepare dialogue, drew chemical structures, and wrote chemical equations that were used as props. Gilligan said Nelson approached the production after watching the series and offered to help with its chemistry. He said the production consulted experts in chemistry, electrical engineering, and physics when needed, although there was no full-time science adviser on set. Gilligan also said that Nelson reviewed scripts to keep the chemistry dialogue accurate and current, and that the production also consulted a Drug Enforcement Administration chemist based in Dallas. Nelson said Gilligan was interested in presenting the science accurately and that this was important to him.

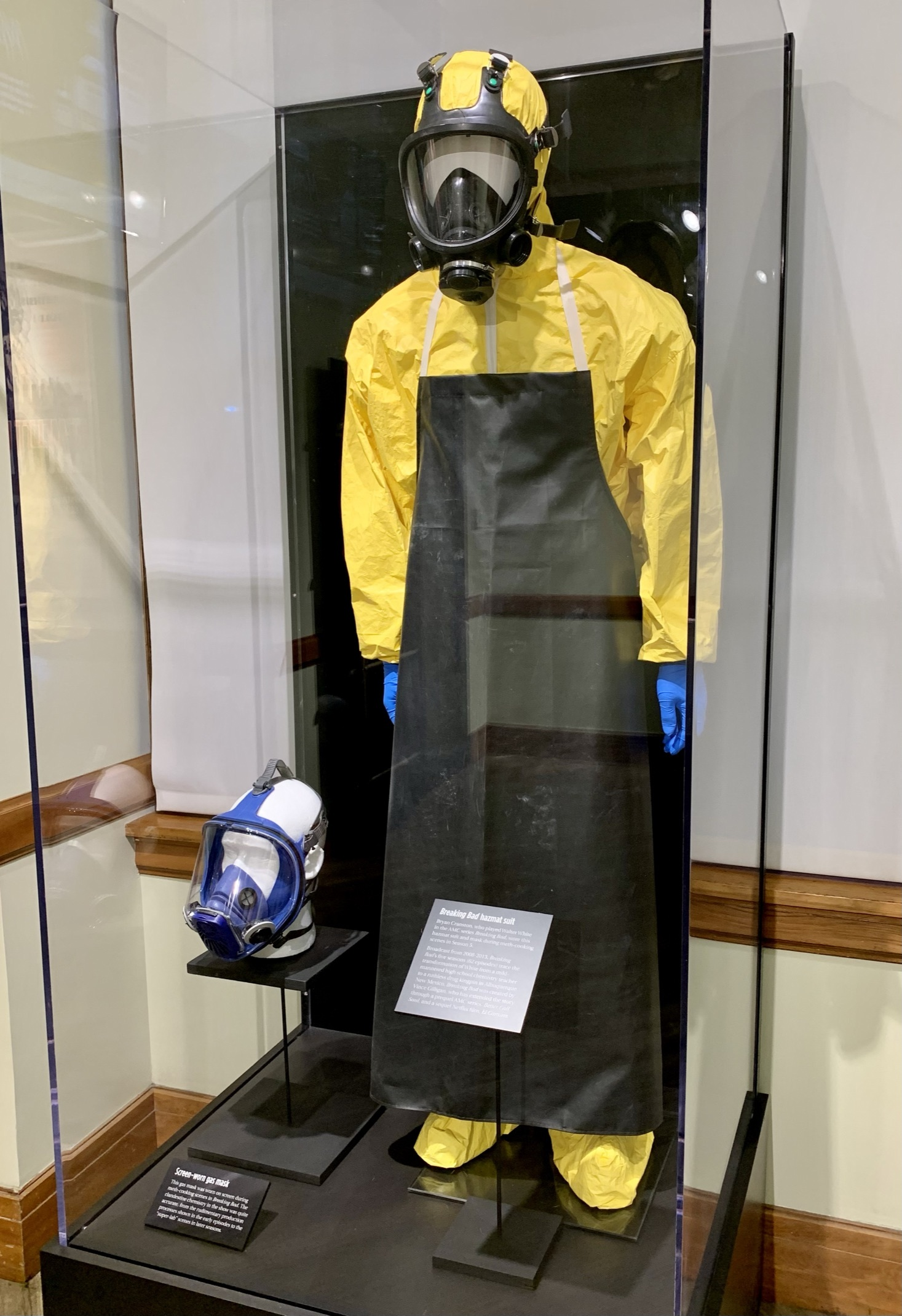
The gas mask worn when characters cook methamphetamine in Breaking Bad is on display at the Mob Museum in Las Vegas.

Several episodes of MythBusters examined the plausibility of scenes from Breaking Bad, with Gilligan sometimes appearing as a guest. In 2013, the MythBusters Breaking Bad special tested two scenes from the first season and concluded that neither was physically plausible as depicted. The tests found that hydrofluoric acid would not fully dissolve metal, flesh, or ceramic as shown in "Cat's in the Bag...". They also found that fulminated mercury could produce an explosion, as shown in "Crazy Handful of Nothin'", but that Walter would have needed a much larger quantity of the compound and would have had to throw it at a much faster speed, likely causing fatal injuries to people in the room. A later MythBusters episode, "Blow It Out of the Water", tested the possibility of mounting an automated machine gun in a car as in the series finale "Felina", and found it plausible. An episode of MythBusters Jr. concluded that the electromagnet scene in "Live Free or Die" was not physically plausible.

Jason Wallach of Vice commended the accuracy of the methamphetamine cooking methods presented in the series. He noted that early episodes depict the Nagai red phosphorus and iodine method, which uses pseudoephedrine as a precursor to d-(+)-methamphetamine. By the season 1 finale, Walter changes to a reductive amination route involving phenyl-2-propanone and methylamine, reflecting the difficulty of obtaining enough pseudoephedrine for larger-scale production. The series depicts phenyl-2-propanone, also known as phenylacetone or P2P, being produced from phenylacetic acid and acetic acid with a tube furnace and thorium dioxide catalyst, and later depicts reduction using mercury aluminum amalgam.

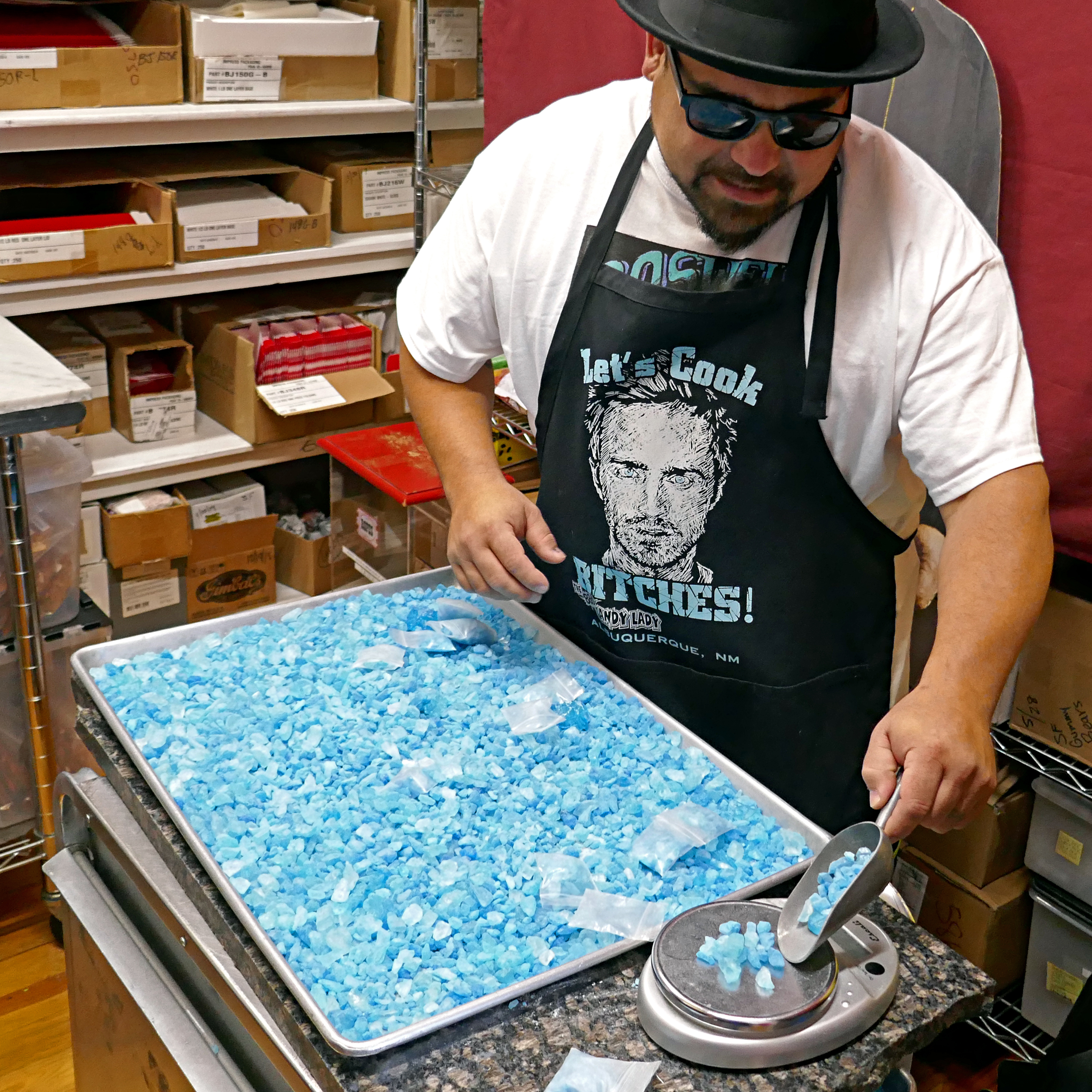
Blue rock candy associated with the series' methamphetamine prop.

The blue color of Walter's methamphetamine is a recurring plot point in the series. Although the product is described as highly pure, pure crystal methamphetamine would normally be colorless or white. Debbie Ball of The Candy Lady in Albuquerque created the methamphetamine prop used in the first two seasons. Ball said the first version was clear and that the blue tint was chosen later by the production.

In their article "Die Chemie bei Breaking Bad" in Chemie in unserer Zeit, translated into English by ChemistryViews as "The Chemistry of Breaking Bad", Tunga Salthammer and Falk Harnisch discuss the plausibility of the chemistry portrayed in the series. They write that chemistry is depicted primarily as a manufacturing science, with limited attention to analytical methods, and that scientific subjects are incorporated into dialogue to support a fictional world in which chemistry plays a central role.

=== Technical aspects ===
Michael Slovis served as cinematographer for Breaking Bad beginning with the second season. Although series creator Vince Gilligan and Slovis wanted to shoot the series in CinemaScope, Sony and AMC did not grant permission. Gilligan cited Sergio Leone's Westerns as a reference for the visual style he wanted for the series. Slovis received four Primetime Emmy Award nominations for Outstanding Cinematography for a One Hour Series and Outstanding Cinematography for a Single-Camera Series.

Breaking Bad was shot on 35 mm film because of the durability of the equipment and the format's suitability for economical production. The use of film also allowed for a later digital transfer to 4K Ultra HD resolution. By the end of the fifth season, episodes cost upwards of US$6 million to produce.

Kelley Dixon was one of the series' editors and edited many of its "meth montages". For the montages, she used techniques such as jump cuts and varied the speed of the footage. Dixon received six Primetime Emmy Award nominations for Outstanding Single-Camera Picture Editing for a Drama Series and won the award in 2013.

== Episodes ==
Season	Episodes		Originally released	
Season	Episodes		First released	Last released
1	7		January 20, 2008	March 9, 2008
2	13		March 8, 2009	May 31, 2009
3	13		March 21, 2010	June 13, 2010
4	13		July 17, 2011	October 9, 2011
5	16	8	July 15, 2012	September 2, 2012
5	16	8	August 11, 2013	September 29, 2013
Film			October 11, 2019	

=== Season 1 (2008) ===
Walter White is diagnosed with inoperable lung cancer after passing out in a car wash. Realizing he doesn't have enough money to pay for treatment, and after going on a drug bust with his brother-in-law DEA agent, Hank, Walt resorts to cooking crystal meth. He decides to team up with his former student, Jesse. Jesse obtains an R.V. to cook in from his friend, Combo, while Walt devises a revolutionary formula using unregulated chemicals, creating a highly pure product tinted blue. Walt's wife Skyler does some researching and finds out about Jesse's history with drugs, and confronts him after Walt creates a fake confession that Jesse dealt him cannabis.

After a run-in with the Mexican cartel, Walt adopts the pseudonym "Heisenberg" and trades his "blue sky" meth with psychotic drug lord Tuco. Hank, along with the rest of the DEA, become aware of Heisenberg's presence in the drug trade and begin investigating.

=== Season 2 (2009) ===
Shortly after Walt and Jesse complete their first deal with Tuco, they are kidnapped by him. After being held hostage for a day, Hank discovers their location, and shoots Tuco dead. Walt and Jesse hide from Hank and are never found. After Hank leaves, Jesse simply returns to town without an excuse while Walt pretends to enter a fugue state. Walt's held in a hospital until doctors are assured it won't happen again. Walt finally tells his doctor he faked the fugue state, although he doesn't tell him what actually happened with Tuco, instead fabricating a story about running away to avoid family. Jesse is interrogated by Hank, but is never arrested.

After a failed attempt by Walter and Jesse to start their own business, resulting in two of Jesse's friends, Badger and Combo, being arrested and murdered respectively, Walt hires corrupt lawyer Saul Goodman, who connects them to high-profile drug distributor Gus Fring and fixer Mike Ehrmantraut. Jesse is kicked out of his Aunt Ginny's house by his parents, and quickly tries to find housing. He finds an apartment, managed by Jane Margolis. Shortly after moving in, Jesse starts dating Jane. Jane introduces him to heroin after relapsing. After selling a shipment to Gus, Walt refuses to pay Jesse his half of the money suspecting he'll use it on drugs, but Jane threatens to reveal Walt's secret to the public if he does. Walt returns to Jesse to apologize but instead finds him and Jane passed out on heroin. Although he is capable of intervening and saving her life, Walter allows an unconscious Jane to choke to death on her own vomit due to an overdose. Jesse wakes up the next morning and finds Jane beside him, dead.

Mike comes over to destroy any trace of their heroin use, and a traumatized Jesse enters rehab. Days after Jane's death, two planes collide mid-air over Albuquerque; a result of Jane's father, Donald Margolis, an air traffic controller, returning to work early despite still being distraught by his daughter's death. After being put under anesthetics for a cancer surgery, Walt accidentally reveals he had two cellphones. This causes Skyler to do some more research, and finally finding out about all of Walt's lies. Skyler confronts Walt and files for divorce.

=== Season 3 (2010) ===
After Skyler confronts him, Walt briefly retires from the drug trade. Despite retiring, Gus manages to convince him to start cooking again, with a new and larger lab. Now being kicked out of the house, Walt moves into an apartment. Skyler comes over, and Walt finally confesses to her about his affiliation with the drug business.

Meanwhile, Jesse, with help from Saul, purchases his house back from his parents. Around this time, Saul hires Mike to install surveillance throughout the White Residence. Hank's investigation leads back to Jesse through the deceased Combo. He finds no evidence, but assaults Jesse in a fit of rage believing he tricked him into thinking his wife, Marie, got into a car crash. Shortly after, he is suspended from the DEA.

Walt, in order to keep Jesse from pressing charges against Hank, coerces Gus into replacing Gale with Jesse as his lab assistant. Hank is attacked by Tuco's vengeful cousins and kills them, becoming paralyzed in the aftermath. Jesse meets Andrea Cantillo in rehab, and they shortly begin dating. She is the older sister of Tomás, the murderer of Combo. She also has a young child, Brock. Jesse's behavior becomes erratic, and Walt is forced to kill two of Gus's drug dealers to protect him. After an enraged Gus orders for them to be killed, Walt convinces Jesse to kill Gale so that Gus is unable to replace them.

After Hank finds out about Gale's drug history, he suspects he was Heisenberg. While being mostly bed ridden, he begins investigating Gale's journals. While reading it with Walt, he finds the initials "W.W.", and jokingly says it was meant for Walt. Walt dismisses it as being a reference to author Walt Whitman, being one of Gale's favorite authors.

=== Season 4 (2011) ===
Originally, mini episodes of four minutes in length were to be produced before the premiere of the fourth season, but these did not come to fruition.

Gus tightens security at the lab after Gale's death, while he and Mike drive a wedge between Walt and Jesse, coercing Jesse to be their solitary cook while at the same time eliminating the Mexican cartel. Skyler accepts Walt's meth cooking and conspires with Saul to launder the earnings through purchasing the car wash Walt used to work at. Hank, in recovery, tracks Gale's death to Gus and the drug trade. Walt tricks Jesse into turning against Gus, through poisoning Brock with a lily of the valley plant, along with convincing Hector Salamanca—the last living member of the cartel—to detonate a bomb while meeting with Gus in the nursing home, killing them both.

=== Season 5 (2012–13) ===
On August 14, 2011, AMC announced that Breaking Bad was renewed for a fifth and final season consisting of 16 episodes. Season five is split into two parts, each consisting of 8 episodes.

After Gus's death, Walt, Jesse, and Mike start a new meth business. When their accomplice Todd kills a child witness during a methylamine theft, Jesse and Mike sell their share of the methylamine to Declan, another distributor. Walter produces meth for Declan, and Gus's former associate Lydia starts distribution in Europe, which is so successful that Walter amasses US$80 million, which he buries on the Tohajiilee Indian Reservation. After Walter kills Mike during an argument, he is given names of Mike's imprisoned men from Lydia. Walt hires Todd's uncle, Jack, and his gang to kill Mike's associates; they also kill Declan.

Hank discovers Walt is Heisenberg and begins gathering evidence. He turns to Jesse, who helps track Walt's money to the reservation. When Walt is arrested, Jack's gang arrives. They kill Hank, capture Jesse, and take most of Walt's money. Walt is forced to flee alone with the remaining money. After months in hiding, Walt plans to surrender but changes course after Elliott and Gretchen publicly minimize his involvement in starting Gray Matter. Walt manipulates Elliott and Gretchen to give his earnings to Walter Jr. After poisoning Lydia, Walt makes amends with Skyler over his criminality. Todd, Jack and his men are killed during a shootout orchestrated by Walt, but Walt is also shot. Jesse is freed and Walt succumbs to his wounds.

== Themes ==
=== Western influences ===
Breaking Bad has been analyzed through the framework of the Western and the modern Western. In 2013, Vince Gilligan described the series as a "modern Western", connecting its New Mexico setting and isolated characters to Western imagery. Scholar Amanda Knopf argues that the series draws on Western motifs while reworking the genre through Walter White's transformation into a violent antihero and through the show's use of desert landscapes, moral ambiguity, and masculine identity.

J. J. Clark similarly places the series within the tradition of frontier narratives and Western film, describing it as both a revisionist Western and a "Meta-Western" that examines how frontier mythology shapes modern characters such as White. Lenora Ledwon also connects the series to Western tropes, arguing that its scenes of bargaining and confrontation resemble the classic Western shootout and tie the show to ideas about the American Dream, masculinity, and the frontier.

=== Morality ===
In an interview with The New York Times, Gilligan said the larger lesson of the series is that "actions have consequences". He elaborated on the show's philosophy:

If religion is a reaction of man, and nothing more, it seems to me that it represents a human desire for wrongdoers to be punished. I hate the idea of Idi Amin living in Saudi Arabia for the last 25 years of his life. That galls me to no end. I feel some sort of need for Biblical atonement, or justice, or something. I like to believe there is some comeuppance, that karma kicks in at some point, even if it takes years or decades to happen. My girlfriend says this great thing that's become my philosophy as well. "I want to believe there's a heaven. But I can't not believe there's a hell."

In a piece comparing the show to The Sopranos, Mad Men and The Wire, author Chuck Klosterman said that Breaking Bad is "built on the uncomfortable premise that there's an irrefutable difference between what's right and what's wrong, and it's the only one where the characters have real control over how they choose to live". Klosterman added that the central question of Breaking Bad is: "What makes a man 'bad' – his actions, his motives, or his conscious decision to be a bad person?" Klosterman concluded that in the world of Breaking Bad, "goodness and badness are simply complicated choices, no different than anything else".

Ross Douthat of The New York Times, in a response to Klosterman's piece, compared Breaking Bad and The Sopranos, stating that both series are "morality plays" that are "both interested in moral agency". Douthat went on to say that Walter White and Tony Soprano "represent mirror-image takes on the problem of evil, damnation, and free will". Walter is a man who "deliberately abandons the light for the darkness" while Tony is "someone born and raised in darkness" who turns down "opportunity after opportunity to claw his way upward to the light".

=== Devotion to family ===
The show explores most of the main characters' connections to their families in great detail. Walt justifies his decision to cook crystal meth and become a criminal because of his desire to provide for his family. In the third season he tries to exit the business because it has driven Skyler to leave him. Gus convinces him to stay, telling him it is a man's job to provide for his family, even if he is unloved. In the final episode of the series, Walt finally admits to Skyler that the main motivation for his endeavors in the meth business was his own interest, in spite of secretly securing the $9.72 million he had managed to salvage for her and the children. Jesse's loneliness in the early seasons of the show can be partly explained by his parents' decision to kick him out of their home due to his drug-related activities. This parental disconnect brings him closer to Jane, whose father berates her for her drug use. When Walt crosses paths with Jane's father, Walt refers to Jesse as his nephew and laments the fact that he cannot get through to him. Jane's father responds by telling him to keep trying, saying, "Family. You can't give up on them, ever. What else is there?" Jane's subsequent death, which Walt let happen while he watched, is what leads in her father accidentally causing the airliner collision at the end of the second season.

Even the show's more hardened characters maintain ties to family. In the second season, Tuco Salamanca spends time caring for his physically disabled uncle, Hector. When Tuco is killed by Hank, his cousins vow revenge. Their actions are further explained in a flashback, where Hector explains to the brothers that "La familia es todo" ("Family is everything"). Gustavo Fring's franchise Los Pollos Hermanos translates to "The Chicken Brothers". This refers to the fact that the company was co-founded by Gus and a man named Max. When Max is killed by Hector Salamanca, Gus vows to destroy the Salamanca family and in particular to humiliate Hector and prolong and draw out his suffering. In the first part of the fifth season, it is explained that Mike Ehrmantraut's intentions for being in this business were to provide for his granddaughter's future, and by his final episode he is conflicted when having to leave her in a park by herself once he has been warned that the police are onto him. During the second part of the fifth season, white supremacist Jack Welker says "don't skimp on family", and he lets Walt live after capturing him in the desert because of love for his nephew Todd Alquist, who has great respect for Walt. Lydia Rodarte-Quayle repeatedly demands that if Mike insists on killing her, that he leave her in her apartment so her daughter can find her, fearful she will think Lydia abandoned her. Much like Walt and Mike, Lydia seems to engage in the meth business in order to provide for her daughter, with actress Laura Fraser stating in an interview that Lydia's daughter is important to how "Lydia justified what she did to herself".

=== Pride ===
Pride/hubris is a major theme in Walter White's tragic character arc. In an interview with The Village Voice, Gilligan identified the tipping point at which Walt "breaks bad" as his prideful decision not to accept Gretchen and Elliott Schwartz's offer to pay for his chemotherapy (season 1, episode 5):

They offer [Walter White] everything he needs. At the end of that hour he says, "Thank you, no," and he goes back to Jesse Pinkman and says, "Let's cook." And that was where the character truly got interesting for me. This guy's got some serious pride issues.

The critically acclaimed episode "Ozymandias" references Percy Bysshe Shelley's sonnet of the same name, which depicts the remnants of an ancient king's prideful legacy lying broken in the desert. The episode draws parallels to the poem, as both antiheroes are left with little to show for their empire-building efforts. Austin Gill of Xavier University stated the episode "evokes the tyrannical aspirations of invincibility and arrogance of Ozymandias himself as represented in Shelley's poem". Douglas Eric Rasmussen of the University of Saskatchewan argued that the "concept of hubris and being punished for grandiose projects that serve an individual's egotism are central aspects of each work". Hank's death marks the beginning of a shift where it becomes increasingly difficult for Walt to continue to insist that he cooks meth for the sake of his family's well-being. By the series finale, Walt finally admits to Skyler that he became Heisenberg for his own ego: "I did it for me. I liked it. I was good at it. And I was really — I was alive."

== Symbolism ==
=== Colors ===
A recurring symbol within Breaking Bad is the use of color, particularly the characters' color for wardrobe, being used to represent a character's state of mind or a relationship between characters or to foreshadow an event. In an interview with Vulture, Vince Gilligan says "Color is important on Breaking Bad; we always try to think in terms of it. We always try to think of the color that a character is dressed in, in the sense that it represents on some level their state of mind."

=== Pink teddy bear ===
The pink teddy bear as seen during the second season

A motif within the second season is the image of a damaged teddy bear and its missing eye. The teddy bear first appears at the end of the music video "Fallacies" for Jesse's band "TwaüghtHammër", which was released as a webisode in February 2009 leading to the second season. The teddy bear can also be spotted on the mural on Jane's bedroom wall during the final episode of the second season, further connecting the crash to Jane. It is seen in flashforwards during four episodes, the titles of which, when put together in order, form the sentence "Seven Thirty-Seven Down Over ABQ". The flashforwards are shot in black and white (a practice that is continued in Better Call Saul), with the sole exception of the pink teddy bear, which is an homage to the film Schindler's List, where the color red is used to distinguish the coat of a very young girl. At the end of the season, Walt indirectly causes the midair collision of two airplanes via Jane's father, a grieving air traffic controller; the pink teddy bear is then revealed to have fallen out of one of the planes and into the Whites' backyard swimming pool. Vince Gilligan called the plane accident an attempt to visualize "all the terrible grief that Walt has wrought upon his loved ones" and "the judgment of God".

In the first episode of the third season, Walt finds the teddy bear's missing eye in the pool skimmer. Television critic Myles McNutt has called it "a symbol of the damage [Walter] feels responsible for", and The A.V. Club commented that "the pink teddy bear continues to accuse". Fans and critics have compared the appearance of the teddy bear's face to an image of Gus Fring's face in the fourth-season finale.

The teddy bear prop was auctioned off, among other memorabilia, on September 29, 2013, the air date of the show finale.

=== Walt Whitman ===
The name "Walter White" is heavily reminiscent of the American poet Walt Whitman. During the series, Gale Boetticher gives Walt a copy of Whitman's Leaves of Grass. Prior to giving this gift, Boetticher recites "When I Heard the Learn'd Astronomer". In the episode "Bullet Points", Hank finds the initials W.W. written in Boetticher's notes, and jokes with Walt that they are his initials, although Walt indicates that they must refer to Whitman.

In the episode "Hazard Pay", Walt finds the copy of Leaves of Grass as he is packing up his bedroom, briefly smiles, and leaves it out to read. This occurs at an especially high point in his life, when he feels that things are coming together and he is succeeding in all his ventures. A poem in the book, "Song of Myself", is based on many of these same feelings, furthering the connection between Walt's life and Whitman's poetry. The mid-season finale of season five, "Gliding Over All", is titled after poem 271 of Leaves of Grass. In the episode, Hank finds Leaves of Grass in Walt's bathroom and opens it to the cover page, where he reads the hand-written inscription: "To my other favorite W.W. It's an honour working with you. Fondly G.B." Upon reading this, Hank becomes visibly shocked, realizing the truth about Walter for the first time, which provides the opening premise for the second half of the final season.

== Reception and legacy ==
=== Critical reception ===
Critical response of Breaking Bad
Season	Rotten Tomatoes	Metacritic
1	86% (43 reviews)	73 (27 reviews)
2	97% (36 reviews)	84 (19 reviews)
3	100% (36 reviews)	89 (15 reviews)
4	100% (36 reviews)	96 (15 reviews)
5	97% (99 reviews)	99 (22 reviews)

Breaking Bad received universal acclaim and has been praised by many critics as one of the greatest television shows of all time. The series has also developed a cult following. The series has an overall rating of 87 of out 100 on Metacritic. The American Film Institute listed Breaking Bad as one of the top ten television series of 2008, 2010, 2011, 2012 and 2013. In 2013, TV Guide ranked it as the ninth greatest TV series of all time. By its end, the series was among the most-watched cable shows on American television, with audience numbers doubling from the fourth season to the fifth. A 2015 survey by The Hollywood Reporter of 2,800 actors, producers, directors, and other industry people named Breaking Bad as their #2 favorite show. In 2016 and 2022, Rolling Stone ranked it third on its list of 100 Greatest TV Shows of All Time. In September 2019, The Guardian ranked the show fifth on its list of the 100 best TV shows of the 21st century, describing it as "[t]he show that arguably killed off the antihero drama: nothing since has been able to top the depraved descent made by Walter White (a never-better Bryan Cranston), from milquetoast chemistry teacher to meth overlord, and few have dared to try". In 2021, Empire ranked Breaking Bad at number two on their list of The 100 Greatest TV Shows of All Time. Allen St. John of Forbes called it "The best TV show ever". In 2021, it was voted the third-best TV series of the 21st century by the BBC, as picked by 206 TV experts from around the world. In 2023, Variety ranked Breaking Bad as the fifth-greatest TV show of all time. In 2023, Breaking Bad was ranked as the best TV series in the last 25 years by critics in a poll conveyed by Rotten Tomatoes. In September 2026, The New York Times ranked the show first on its list of the 100 best TV shows of the 21st century.

For the first season, the series saw a generally positive reception. Robert Bianco of USA Today praised Cranston and Paul, exclaiming, "There is humor in the show, mostly in Walt's efforts to impose scholarly logic on the business and on his idiot apprentice, a role Paul plays very well. But even their scenes lean toward the suspenseful, as the duo learns that killing someone, even in self-defense, is ugly, messy work."

The second season saw critical acclaim. Entertainment Weekly critic Ken Tucker stated "Bad is a superlatively fresh metaphor for a middle-age crisis: It took cancer and lawbreaking to jolt Walt out of his suburban stupor, to experience life again—to take chances, risk danger, do things he didn't think himself capable of doing. None of this would work, of course, without Emmy winner Cranston's ferocious, funny selflessness as an actor. For all its bleakness and darkness, there's a glowing exhilaration about this series: It's a feel-good show about feeling really bad." San Francisco Chronicle's Tim Goodman claimed, "The first three episodes of Season 2 that AMC sent out continue that level of achievement with no evident missteps. In fact, it looks as if Gilligan's bold vision for Breaking Bad, now duly rewarded against all odds, has invigorated everyone involved in the project. You can sense its maturity and rising ambition in each episode." Horror novelist Stephen King lauded the series, comparing it to the likes of Twin Peaks and Blue Velvet.

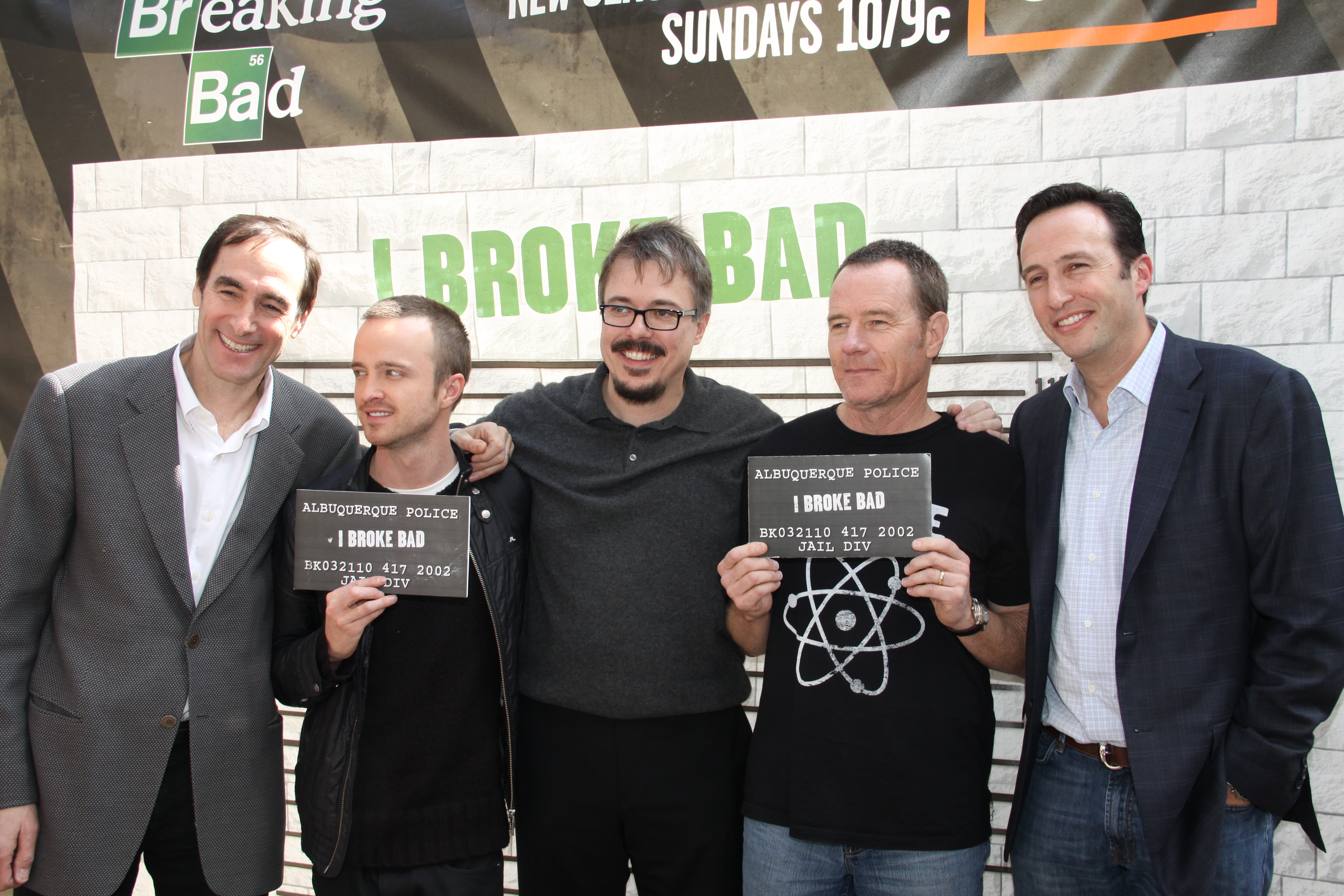
From left to right: Josh Sapan (AMC president and CEO), Aaron Paul (Jesse Pinkman), Vince Gilligan (creator), Bryan Cranston (Walter White) and Charlie Collier (President, general manager)

The third season also saw critical acclaim. Time proclaimed, "It's a drama that has chosen the slow burn over the flashy explosion, and it's all the hotter for that choice." Newsday stated Breaking Bad was still TV's best series and it stayed true to itself. Tim Goodman praised the writing, acting, and cinematography, pointing out the "visual adventurousness" of the series. Goodman went on to call the show's visuals "a combination of staggering beauty – the directors make use of numerous wide-angle landscape portraits – and transfixing weirdness". After the finale aired, The A.V. Club said that season three was "one of television's finest dramatic accomplishments. And what makes it so exciting – what makes the recognition of the current golden age so pressing – is that the season has not been, as [another reviewer] put it in another context, 'television good.' The heart-in-the-throat quality of this season comes as much from the writers' exhilarating disregard for television conventions as from the events portrayed."

Season four won near-universal critical acclaim. The Boston Globe referred to the show as a "taut exercise in withheld disaster" and declared the show "riveting". The Pittsburgh Post-Gazette labeled the series "smart and thought provoking that elevates the artistic achievements of the medium". Season four was listed by many critics as one of the best seasons of television in 2011. Time listed Walter White's "I am the one who knocks" line as one of the best television lines of 2011. The Pittsburgh Post-Gazette listed it as the best series of 2011 while noting that "Breaking Bad is that rare TV series that has never made a seriously damaging storytelling misstep". The A.V. Club's review of the finale summed it up as a "fantastically fitting end for a season that ran in slow motion, starting and continuing with so many crises begging for resolution week after week. Now the decks are cleared, but that doesn't mean anybody is home free. Nothing's ever easy on Breaking Bad." The reviewer continued to exalt the season, and proclaimed, "What a season of television – truly something none of us could ever have expected, or claimed we deserved."

Both halves of the fifth season received overwhelming critical acclaim. Following the end of the series, critic Nick Harley summarized his commendation of the show: "Expertly written, virtuosic with its direction, and flawlessly performed, Breaking Bad is everything you could want in a drama. Critics will spend the next decade dissecting and arguing about what made it great, but the reasons are endless and already well documented." During the final season, the show also received praise from George R. R. Martin, author of the A Song of Ice and Fire novels, particularly the episode "Ozymandias"; Martin commented that "Walter White is a bigger monster than anyone in Westeros". In his review of the second half of season 5, Seth Amitin of IGN stated, "This final batch of Breaking Bad is one of the best run of episodes TV has ever offered", and praised "Ozymandias" in particular, referring to it as "maybe the best episode of TV [he's] ever seen". Jonah Goldberg of National Review called it "the best show currently on television, and perhaps even the best ever". The veteran actor Sir Anthony Hopkins wrote a letter of praise to Bryan Cranston, telling him that his "performance as Walter White was the best acting I have seen – ever". He lauded the rest of the cast and crew as well. The letter first appeared on Steven Michael Quezada's (who portrayed DEA Agent Steven Gomez) Facebook page, and in spite of it being taken down, the letter soon went viral. In an interview, filmmaker David Lynch, who had described cable television as "the new arthouse," named Breaking Bad as one of the shows he liked. When asked whether he was satisfied with the way the series ended, Lynch said, "Oh, I thought it was good! That was a great show. Really great show." In 2013, Guinness World Records named Breaking Bad the highest-rated TV series of all time, citing its season 5 Metacritic score of 99 out of 100.

In 2018, Paul MacInnes of The Guardian wrote: "Breaking Bad became a classic drama for many reasons: some to do with craft, some to do with creativity. But above all else it stood out because, however surreal the surroundings, in its conflicted, complicated characters it was true to reality."

=== Controversies ===
Breaking Bad has been accused by some members of the law enforcement and legal communities of normalizing or glorifying methamphetamine creation and usage. In 2013, a local prosecutor and self-proclaimed Breaking Bad fan wrote on Time's website:

"While Breaking Bad may not glorify meth in the sense of making it attractive to the average viewer, it does normalize the idea of meth for a broad segment of society that might otherwise have no knowledge of that dark and dangerous world. [...] I'll continue to wonder about the long-term effects of mainstreaming such a dangerous drug into popular culture. I'll be mindful that there are others for whom the consequences of drug addiction are a miserable and persistent reality, not merely the stuff of a TV drama, no matter how "gritty" and artful and captivating."

A Telegraph article published in 2014 stated that a "leading academic" blamed the series for a "shocking" increase in crystal meth use. Some have speculated that the show's realistic depiction of methamphetamine use may have deterred potential users, resulting in lower rates of meth use since 2006. DEA spokesperson Barbara Carreno has dismissed this notion, instead attributing the drop in use to the Combat Methamphetamine Epidemic Act of 2005, which resulted in pseudoephedrine being listed as a controlled substance. She was quoted saying:

"The numbers go up and down and up and down over the years, but generally speaking, it's never reached the 2006 levels. [...] We've gotten many, many, many calls about Breaking Bad. We're not commenting on Breaking Bad. Breaking Bad is fiction."

In 2014, American toy retailer Toys "R" Us pulled four collectable action figures from its stores after complaints from a concerned parent out of Florida, due to the inclusion of toy drug money and toy meth. Bryan Cranston took to Twitter, joking: "I'm so mad, I'm burning my Florida Mom action figure in protest."

In 2022, the erection of statues of Walter White and Jesse Pinkman in New Mexico drew criticism from some Republican figures. Variety reported that conservative talk radio host Eddy Aragon said: "It's not the type of recognition we want for the city of Albuquerque, or for our state. What you saw on Breaking Bad should be a documentary, honestly. I think, really, that is the reality in New Mexico. We try to say it's fictional, but that is the reality... we've joked that [Breaking Bad] should be on PBS. That is, unfortunately, the reality." Vince Gilligan said: "In all seriousness, no doubt some folks are going to say, 'Wow, just what our city needed.' And I get that. I see two of the finest actors America has ever produced. I see them, in character, as two larger-than-life tragic figures, cautionary tales." Highlighting the revenue and economic activity that the series had brought to the area, Albuquerque Democratic Mayor Tim Keller defended the erection of the statues, saying: "While the stories might be fictional... jobs are real every single day. The city is also a character... We see ourselves in so many ways, good and bad."

=== Ratings ===
Breaking Bad premiered on the same night as both the NFC and AFC Championships in the 2008 NFL playoffs, an intentional decision by AMC hoping to capture the adult male viewership immediately following the planned end of the NFC game. The game ran over its time slot, cutting into Breaking Bad's timeslot in most of America. As a result, the pilot had only about 1.4 million viewers. Coupled with the ongoing writers strike, the first season did not draw as large of a viewership as they expected. However, with subsequent seasons, viewership increased, avoiding the usual trend of downward viewership that most serialized shows had. Ratings further increased by the fourth season as, prior to airing, the previous seasons had been added to Netflix, boosting interest in the show. Breaking Bad is considered the first show to have had such a renewed burst of interest due to the show being made available on Netflix. The second half of the final season saw record viewership, with the series finale reaching over 10.3 million viewers.

Viewership and ratings per season of Breaking Bad
Season	Timeslot (ET)	Episodes	First aired		Last aired		Avg. viewers (millions)
Season	Timeslot (ET)	Episodes	Date	Viewers (millions)	Date	Viewers (millions)	Avg. viewers (millions)
1	Sunday 10:00 pm	7	January 20, 2008	1.41	March 9, 2008	1.50	1.23
2	Sunday 10:00 pm	13	March 8, 2009	1.66	May 31, 2009	1.50	1.30
3	Sunday 10:00 pm	13	March 21, 2010	1.95	June 13, 2010	1.56	1.52
4	Sunday 10:00 pm	13	July 17, 2011	2.58	October 9, 2011	1.90	1.87
5A	Sunday 10:00 pm	8	July 15, 2012	2.93	September 2, 2012	2.78	N/A
5B	Sunday 9:00 pm	8	August 11, 2013	5.92	September 29, 2013	10.28	N/A

Breaking Bad : U.S. viewers per episode (millions)
Audience measurement performed by Nielsen Media Research

=== Awards and nominations ===
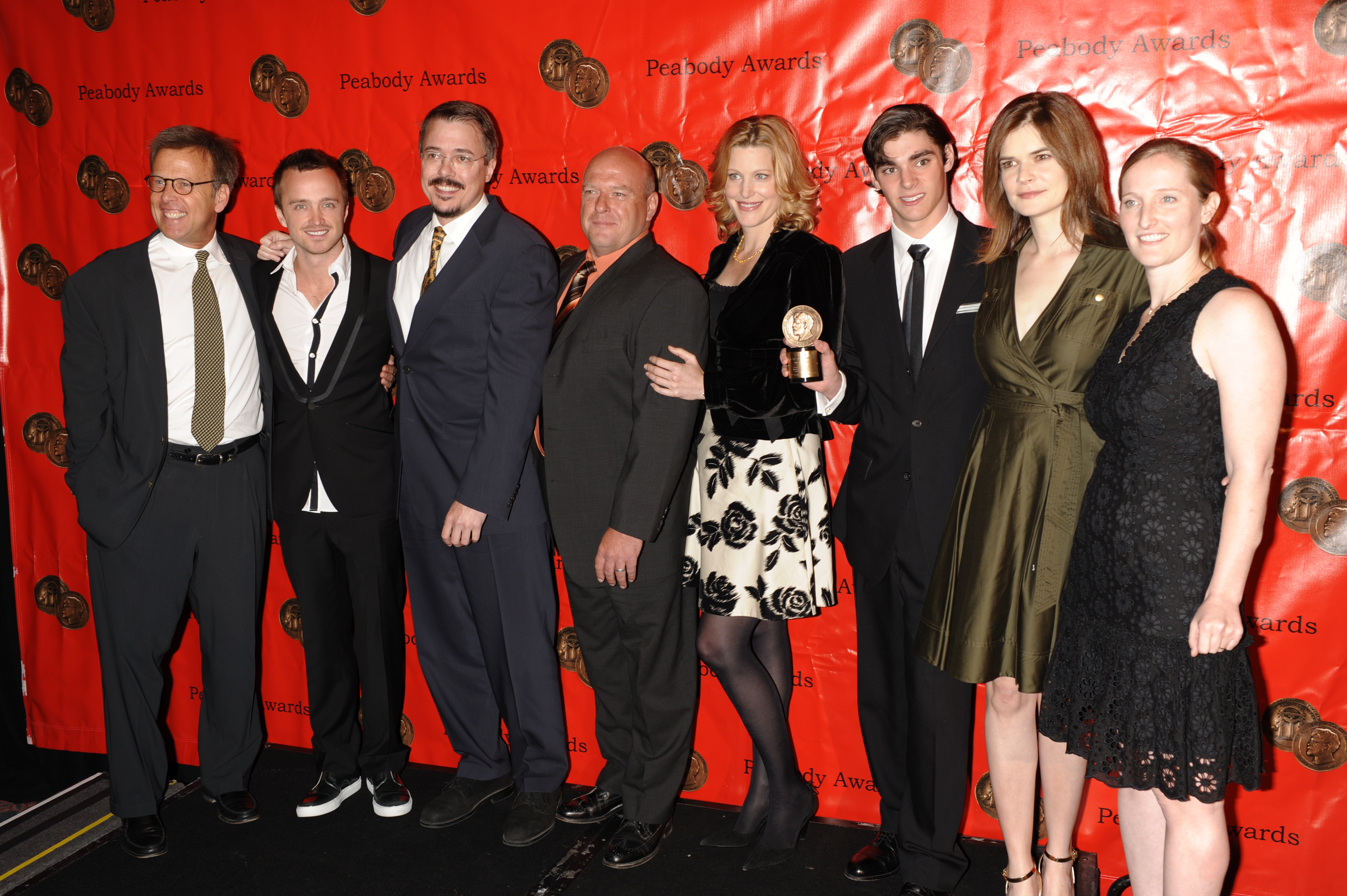
The cast and crew of Breaking Bad at the 68th Annual Peabody Awards

The series received numerous awards and nominations, including 16 Primetime Emmy Awards and 58 nominations, including winning for Outstanding Drama Series in 2013 and 2014. It also won two Peabody Awards, one in 2008 and one in 2013.

For his portrayal of Walter White, Bryan Cranston won the Primetime Emmy Award for Outstanding Lead Actor in a Drama Series four times, in 2008, 2009, 2010, and 2014. Cranston also won the TCA Award for Individual Achievement in Drama in 2009 and the Satellite Award for Best Actor – Television Series: Drama in 2008, 2009, and 2010, as well as the Critics' Choice Television Award for Best Actor in a Drama Series and the Saturn Award for Best Actor on Television in 2012.

Aaron Paul won the Primetime Emmy Award for Outstanding Supporting Actor in a Drama Series in 2010, 2012, and 2014. Paul also won the Saturn Award for Best Supporting Actor on Television in 2010 and 2012. Anna Gunn won the Primetime Emmy Award for Outstanding Supporting Actress in a Drama Series in 2013 and 2014. For his work on season four, Giancarlo Esposito won the Critics' Choice Television Award for Best Supporting Actor in a Drama Series.

In 2010 and 2012, Breaking Bad won the TCA Award for Outstanding Achievement in Drama, as well as the TCA Award for Program of the Year in 2013. In 2009 and 2010, the series won the Satellite Award for Best Television Series – Drama, along with the Saturn Award for Best Syndicated/Cable Television Series in 2010, 2011, and 2012. The series won the Writers Guild of America Award for Television: Dramatic Series in both 2012 and 2013. In 2013, it was named No. 13 in a list of the 101 Best-Written TV Series of All Time by the Writers Guild of America and won, for the first time, the Primetime Emmy Award for Outstanding Drama Series. Overall, the show has won 110 industry awards and has been nominated for 262.

== Home media ==
Each season would be released on DVD. The complete series was released on DVD and Blu-ray on November 26, 2013, in a collectable box shaped like one of the barrels used by Walt to bury his money. The set contains various features, including a two-hour documentary and a humorous alternative ending that features Cranston and his Malcolm in the Middle co-star Jane Kaczmarek playing their characters Hal and Lois, in a nod to the final scene from Newhart.

Season	Release dates	Episodes	Special features	Discs	Refs
Season	Region 1	Episodes	Special features	Discs	Refs
The Complete First Season	March 3, 2009	7	List: Digitally Remastered Audio and Video; Widescreen Presentations; Featurette: Making Breaking Bad; Featurettes: Inside Breaking Bad (14 Featurettes); Deleted Scenes; Vince Gilligan's Photo Gallery; Commentary on Pilot and "Crazy Handful of Nothin" Episodes; Screen Tests; AMC Shootout: Interview with Vince Gilligan and Bryan Cranston	3	
The Complete Second Season	March 9, 2010	13	List: Digitally Remastered Audio and Video; Widescreen Presentations; Cast and Crew Commentaries; Deleted Scenes; Inside Breaking Bad - 13 Featurettes About the Making of Each Episode; Season 1 Recap; "Negro y Azul" Music Video; "Better Call Saul" Commercial; 11 Behind the Scenes Featurettes; Cop Talk with Dean Norris; Gag Reel; Walt's Warning Featurette; 6 Breaking Bad Original Webisodes; Season 3 Sneak Peek; Vince Gilligan's Photo Gallery Blu-ray exclusives: Writers' Lab - An Interactive Guide to the Elements of an Episode	4	
The Complete Third Season	June 7, 2011	13	List: Cast & Crew commentary on nine episodes; "Hit and Run"; "The Music of Breaking Bad"; "White Heat: Cranston on Fire"; "Pizza of Destiny: Cranston's Greatest Shot"; "Silent But Deadly: The Brothers Moncada"; Outtakes; Deleted Scenes & Unused Footage; Team S.C.I.E.N.C.E featurette; AMC News Visits the Breaking Bad Writer's Room; Mini Video Podcasts for every episode with the Cast and Crew; Inside Breaking Bad: 20 episodes that give a behind-the-scenes look of what it takes to create an episode Blu-ray exclusives: Breaking Bad Cast and Crew Photo Collection	4	
The Complete Fourth Season	June 5, 2012	13	List: Uncensored Episodes; Deleted and Extended Scenes; Cast & Crew Commentaries on All 13 Episodes; Gag Reel; 30 Featurettes; "Better Call Saul" Commercials; Karaoke Video Featuring Gale Boetticher Blu-ray exclusives: 13 Video Podcasts, with a Total Run Time of More than Two Hours	4	
The Fifth Season	June 4, 2013	8	List: "Chicks 'N' Guns"; Cast & crew commentaries on every episode; Deleted scenes; Outtakes; "Nothing Stops This Train"; "The Cleaner: Jonathan Banks as Mike"; "Chicks 'N' Guns: Behind-the-Scenes"; "Writers' Room Timelapse"; Laura Fraser & Jesse Plemons audition footage; Prison stunt rehearsal footage; "Gallery 1988 Art Show"; "Chris Hardwick's All-Star Celebrity Bowling"; Inside Breaking Bad: 19 episodes that give a behind-the-scenes look of what it takes to create an episode Blu-ray exclusives: "Scene by Scene: Directors Discuss Memorable Moments"; "The Writers of Breaking Bad"	3	
The Final Season	November 26, 2013	8	List: Cast and Crew Commentaries on Every Episode; "The Main Event"; "The Final Showdown"; "Life of a Show Runner"; Behind-the-Scenes of the Alternate Ending; Alternate Ending - A 3-minute alternate version of how Breaking Bad could have ended.; Deleted & Extended Scenes; Gag Reel; Walt's Confession; The Layers of a Sound Mix; Over 15 Episodes of Inside Breaking Bad; Uncensored and Extended Episodes Blu-ray exclusives: "Blood Money" Table Read	3	
The Complete Series	November 26, 2013	62	Collects the previously released box-sets	21	

== Retrospective conversations ==
=== Writers reunion ===
There was a hive mind with these wonderful writers, where I don't remember who said what, and it doesn't even matter whose idea was whose. But I remember one afternoon, somebody said – and I was kind of into it for a while – "Wouldn't it be really ironic if Walt is the only one to survive this?" Because it does seem so obvious that Walt should expire at the end of the final episode – but maybe he's the only one left alive. Maybe he still does have a death sentence, but we go out on him alive, and maybe his whole family's been wiped out. That would have been really f—ing dark.

— Vince Gilligan, on an alternate ending

Variety held a Q&A with most of the original writing staff to reflect on the show's run, the final season, the writing process, and alternative endings. Along with creator Vince Gilligan, fellow writers and producers Peter Gould, Thomas Schnauz, Gennifer Hutchison, Moira Walley-Beckett, Sam Catlin and George Mastras joined to discuss memories from the show's humble beginnings, character transformations that concluded in the final season as well as surprising developments along the way. For instance, Jesse's character was originally supposed to die halfway through season one in a tragic drug deal gone horribly wrong. The reasoning behind this decision was that Jesse served his purpose "in a meat-and-potatoes, logistical sense. The character would give Walt his entrée into the business" before meeting his demise. However, this was eventually done away with as the story progressed beyond Gilligan's early scripts.

The writers also opened up on their collaborative process and how their form of storytelling evolved with the show. According to writer George Mastras,

Screen time was precious, and infusing every moment with the emotion [was the point], not just forming the pieces of the puzzle to tell the story, which is hard enough. If you're going to take five seconds of screen time, you'd better damn well be sure that there's an emotion there. It may be very, very subtle, but trust the audiences to pick up on that, because audiences do.

The development of certain characters posed challenges. Skyler became unsympathetic to some viewers in earlier seasons as she was often presented as an obstacle to Walt's ultimate agenda. The writers struggled to change the dynamic and realized that "the only way people were going to like Skyler was if she started going along with what Walt was doing". It was a tricky shift to alter on screen; the writers did not want to betray her character. This led them to justify the change by using her past job as a bookkeeper to segue into her helping Walt launder his money. Breaking the individual episodes was another form of problem-solving for the writers. They stressed the importance of not letting the "master plan" stop them from staying true to the world they created. There came a point where tracking the characters on a moment-by-moment basis proved to be more useful rather than the general direction of the story. Gould said they would always start with the last thought in a character's head. "Where's Jesse's head at? That was always the prelude to the breakthrough moment, because when you said that, it's usually because we had gotten attached to some big plan or some big set-piece that we thought had to be there, but the characters didn't want to do what we wanted them to do."

=== Audience response to Skyler ===
Particular backlash was directed towards the character of Skyler White. It has sparked an ongoing dialogue about a number of topics, including society's attitude towards women, feminism, sexism, and double standards.

In August 2013 (while Breaking Bad was in its original run) Anna Gunn published an op-ed in The New York Times titled "I Have a Character Issue" in which she discussed her experience playing Skyler, with particular focus on the vitriol that audience members directed towards her character. She compared Skyler to similar television wives who seemed to inspire venom from audience members that their respective husbands did not, in particular Carmela Soprano from The Sopranos and Betty Draper from Mad Men. In Gunn's words, "Vince Gilligan, the creator of Breaking Bad, wanted Skyler to be a woman with a backbone of steel who would stand up to whatever came her way, who wouldn't just collapse in the corner or wring her hands in despair. He and the show's writers made Skyler multilayered and, in her own way, morally compromised. But at the end of the day, she hasn't been judged by the same set of standards as Walter".

In a 2018 cast reunion, Aaron Paul commented "Why did our audience not sympathize with this poor woman? I really felt for Anna, because she's just such a beautiful human inside and out, and she played Skyler in such a fierce way, and people just dragged her character the most."

Vince Gilligan has defended both Skyler and Anna Gunn, saying at the same 2018 reunion "I figured Walt would be the one that'd be hard for people to sympathize with. Suddenly, lo and behold, we're hearing this animus toward Skyler White. To this day, it confounds me. Anna Gunn gave such a brilliant performance. We never tried for sympathy or lack of sympathy, we let the chips fall where they may. I would change that if I had a magic wand." He later buttressed these sentiments in a 2022 interview, adding "I realize in hindsight that the show was rigged in the sense that the storytelling was solely through Walt's eyes, even in scenes he wasn't present for. Even Gus, his archenemy, didn't suffer the animosity Skyler received. It's a weird thing. I'm still thinking about it all these years later."

Bryan Cranston has also defended Gunn and Skyler, saying "If you look at the elements that were involved in this—husband she finds out is lying, husband she finds out is doing something illegal, is doing something that puts her family in lethal danger, and she's being chastised—it's like, 'Wait a minute.' It baffled me from an objective standpoint."

In 2018, Gunn reflected on her experiences on the show, saying "This is not about me, Anna Gunn, and it's really not about Skyler. It's about the way people are connecting to him (Walter). It's also about the way that people still hold on to, perhaps, older ideas of what a woman or a wife should be or how she should act, or how she should behave. In the end, change isn't always comfortable and isn't always pleasant, but it's good that it was brought to people's attention and consciousness."

Reflecting more than a decade after the show ended, Gunn remarked that she saw an improvement as to how the character of Skyler White was received, as well as in the state of television actresses and female characters in general. She said "when people come up to me, it's incredibly different ... There's still a long way to go, but we have made seismic changes since then. So people come up to me now and say, 'You were the linchpin for me. You were the conscience of the show. You were what pulled me into the show.' Or they say, 'The first time I watched it, I hated that character. But the second time I watched it, I realized, 'Oh my God, that poor woman.''"

=== Rian Johnson's experience on the show ===
Director Rian Johnson worked on three episodes ("Fly", "Fifty-One" and "Ozymandias") and, in a 2018 interview with IGN, shared his memories from behind the camera. He shed some light on the process including the fact that he sat through "tone meetings" with Gilligan. The two of them talked about every dramatic beat in a script, the distinct visual look of the show, and how the tonal shift of each scene had to feel natural while serving the main storyline of the particular episode. Johnson also revealed that he learned so much about working with actors because of his directing of Cranston and Paul, describing the experience as a "free masterclass".

When asked about the show's lasting legacy, Johnson said:

I think the seriousness and depth with which it took its characters is the thing that really makes it stand apart for me. And that's where the power of it comes from. Obviously, starting with Walter White, there's just very few stories that are told on that scale, that have a character who is that deeply considered at the center of it. And I've heard people describe it as Shakespearean, and I know that word gets tossed around a lot, but I think in this case it really does apply. And that speaks, not so much to the fact that he goes to a dark place, but the fact that his entire journey is so deeply resonant, because it's so deeply considered.

== Franchise ==
Breaking Bad's success caused numerous spin-offs and a media franchise. This includes a spin-off prequel series, a Spanish-language adaptation, a sequel film, a talk show, and a video game.

== Cultural impact ==
Several attempts to create a real restaurant concept after Los Pollos Hermanos have occurred, most notably in 2019, Family Style, Inc., a chain of restaurants in California, Nevada, and Illinois, which secured rights from Sony and with Gilligan's blessing to sell chicken dinners through Uber Eats under the name and branding "Los Pollos Hermanos" in a three-year deal.

Law enforcement authorities have reported occasional instances of seizing blue crystal methamphetamine in drug-related arrests and raids. The appearance of "blue meth" in real-world drug use has been attributed to Breaking Bad's popularity.

In 2015, series creator Vince Gilligan publicly requested fans of the series to stop re-enacting a scene from "Caballo sin Nombre" in which Walter angrily throws a pizza onto his own roof after Skyler refuses to let him inside the house; this came after complaints from the home's real-life owner.

In a 2025 interview, the actor Nicolas Cage said that watching Breaking Bad convinced him to pivot to television, leading him to accept the lead role in Spider-Noir.

=== Role reprisals ===
Beyond appearances in Better Call Saul and El Camino, Cranston reprised his role as Walter in a commercial for Esurance which aired during Super Bowl XLIX, one week before the premiere of Breaking Bad spin-off Better Call Saul. Another ad for PopCorners, featuring Cranston, Paul, and Cruz reprising their roles and directed by Gilligan, aired for Super Bowl LVII.

=== Tributes from Albuquerque ===
A Breaking Bad fan group placed a paid obituary for Walter White in the Albuquerque Journal, October 4, 2013. On October 19, 2013, a mock funeral procession (including a hearse and a replica of Walter's meth lab RV) and service for the character was held at Albuquerque's Sunset Memorial Park cemetery. A headstone was placed with a photo of Cranston as Walter. While some residents were unhappy with the makeshift gravesite for closure with the show, tickets for the event raised nearly $17,000 for a local charity called Healthcare for the Homeless.

Gilligan and Sony Pictures Television commissioned and donated a bronze statue of Walter and Jesse to the city of Albuquerque in July 2022, which is on display at the Albuquerque Convention Center.

=== New Mexico Law Review ===
In May 2015, the New Mexico Law Review published a collection of eight articles by legal scholars, each dedicated to dissecting legal issues presented by Breaking Bad. The articles discussed issues such as whether the attorney–client privilege would protect communications with Saul Goodman, and whether Walter White could have filed a lawsuit to force his way back into Gray Matter Technologies.
