= Rolling meth lab =

Mobile methamphetamine laboratory used to evade law enforcement detection

A rolling meth lab is a transportable laboratory that is used for the illegal manufacture of the drug methamphetamine. Rolling meth labs are often moved to a secluded location where the strong fumes of methamphetamine manufacture will go undetected, and where the toxic manufacturing byproducts can be discarded. They are sometimes designed to manufacture the drug while the lab is traveling.

== Transportation hazard ==
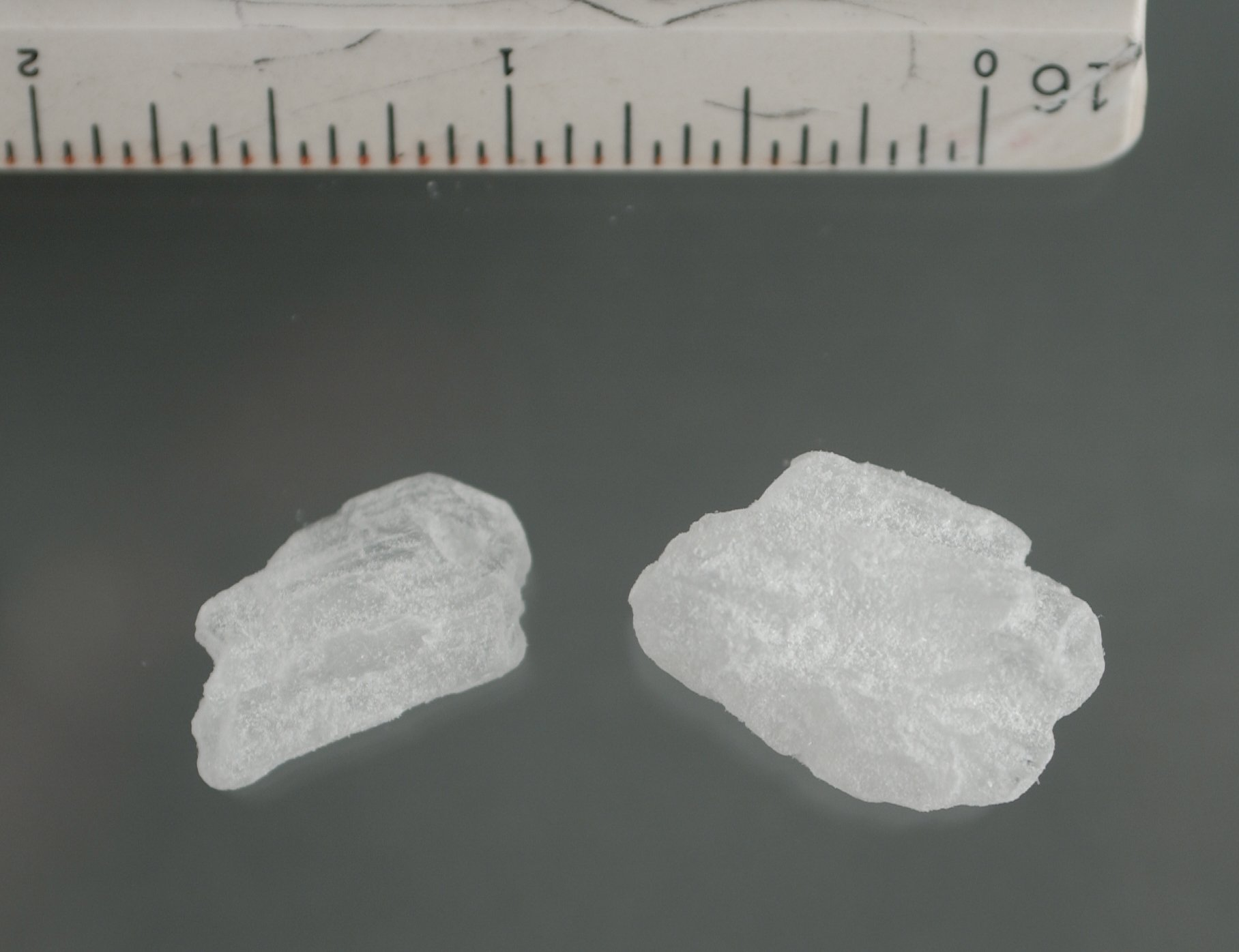
Methamphetamine crystals

The process of synthesizing methamphetamine (also known as "cooking") can be dangerous as it involves poisonous, flammable, and explosive chemicals. When the lab is mobile, it presents a risk to wherever it happens to be, as demonstrated in November 2001, when a rolling meth lab carrying anhydrous ammonia exploded on Interstate 24 in Kentucky, prompting law enforcement to shut down the highway. Such incidents have not only injured the meth producers, but have injured passing motorists and police officers, who are also exposed to dangerous fumes.

The main dangers of transporting depend on the method used to produce the methamphetamine. One of the dangers includes anhydrous ammonia stolen from farm sites — where it is used as fertilizer — and placed into a household ice cooler or other container not designed to hold this volatile gas. Inhalation of the gas can cause severe lung damage or even death. In an accident, the vessels used to contain this gas generally fail.

The use of anhydrous ammonia has dropped significantly since the introduction of the 'shake and bake' method of methamphetamine production. This method cuts out the need for anhydrous ammonia as well as red phosphorus. All the ingredients are simply placed into a bottle and shaken while the chemical reaction occurs. This reaction occurs under pressure and the bottle must be frequently unscrewed to release pressure. Methamphetamine producers often call this "burping" the bottle. The dangers of transporting a shake and bake lab are similar to those of transporting anhydrous ammonia. If the bottle turns on its side and certain ingredients combine with each other, an explosion can occur. This is because the organic solvent is exposed to lithium and water in the presence of oxygen when the bottle tips, and the lithium reaction causes the combustion.

== Toxic effects and dangerous remnants ==
As with a home lab, the remaining fumes from a crude moving methamphetamine lab can be extremely toxic. The surfaces of the vehicle's interior can be coated or impregnated with the poisonous residue, rendering the vehicle worthless. Vehicles stolen for the single purpose of manufacture of the drug are most often considered contaminated and unusable, as exposure to the by-products of the chemical reaction remaining in the vehicle is frequently too dangerous to attempt decontamination. A further complication is that the "cooking" methods for meth frequently change, so the proper remediation for a given lab site cannot be assumed from previous known lab methods.

Law enforcement Hazmat teams assigned to dispose of the toxic materials must be cautious and receive training on a regular basis. As of October 23, 2014, the United States Environmental Protection Agency (EPA) as put forth by the Guidelines for Methamphetamine Laboratory Cleanup provides technical guidance for state and local personnel responsible for methamphetamine (meth) lab cleanup. The Guidelines are based on an extensive review of the best available science and practices and addresses general cleanup activities, identifies best practices for specific items or materials, discusses sampling procedures, and provides additional technical resources. The Guidelines for Methamphetamine Laboratory Cleanup provides technical guidance for state and local personnel responsible for methamphetamine (meth) lab cleanup. To find a licensed and certified company, the National Crime Scene Clean Up Association has compiled the EPA approved vendor list. This is a revision on The Methamphetamine Remediation Research Act of 2007 EPA develop guidelines for remediating former methamphetamine labs. This document provides those guidelines for States and local agencies to improve "our national understanding of identifying the point at which former methamphetamine laboratories become clean enough to inhabit again." The legislation also required that EPA periodically update the guidelines, as appropriate, to reflect the best available knowledge and research.

== Law enforcement and detection ==
Rolling meth labs can be concealed on or in vehicles as large as 18 wheelers or as small as motorcycles. Rolling labs are more difficult to detect than stationary ones and can be often hidden amidst legal cargo on big trucks. Many rolling lab discoveries were the result of an officer just "stumbling" onto them. Improved officer training and checking suspicious vehicles with K-9 units may allow increased detection.

== In popular culture ==
- A recurring location in several early episodes of the television series Breaking Bad is a 1986 Fleetwood Bounder motorhome used by Walter White and Jesse Pinkman as their mobile laboratory.
- A mobile crack cocaine factory features as a lyrical motif in Full Metal Jackoff, a side-long track on Jello Biafra's collaboration with D.O.A, Last Scream of the Missing Neighbors.

== See also ==
- Methamphetamine — Illegal synthesis
- Drug abuse
- Drug addiction
- Grow house, for cultivating marijuana
- War on drugs, campaign led by the United States government
- Breaking Bad, a popular television drama (2008–2013)
