= The Candy Lady =

Candy store in Albuquerque

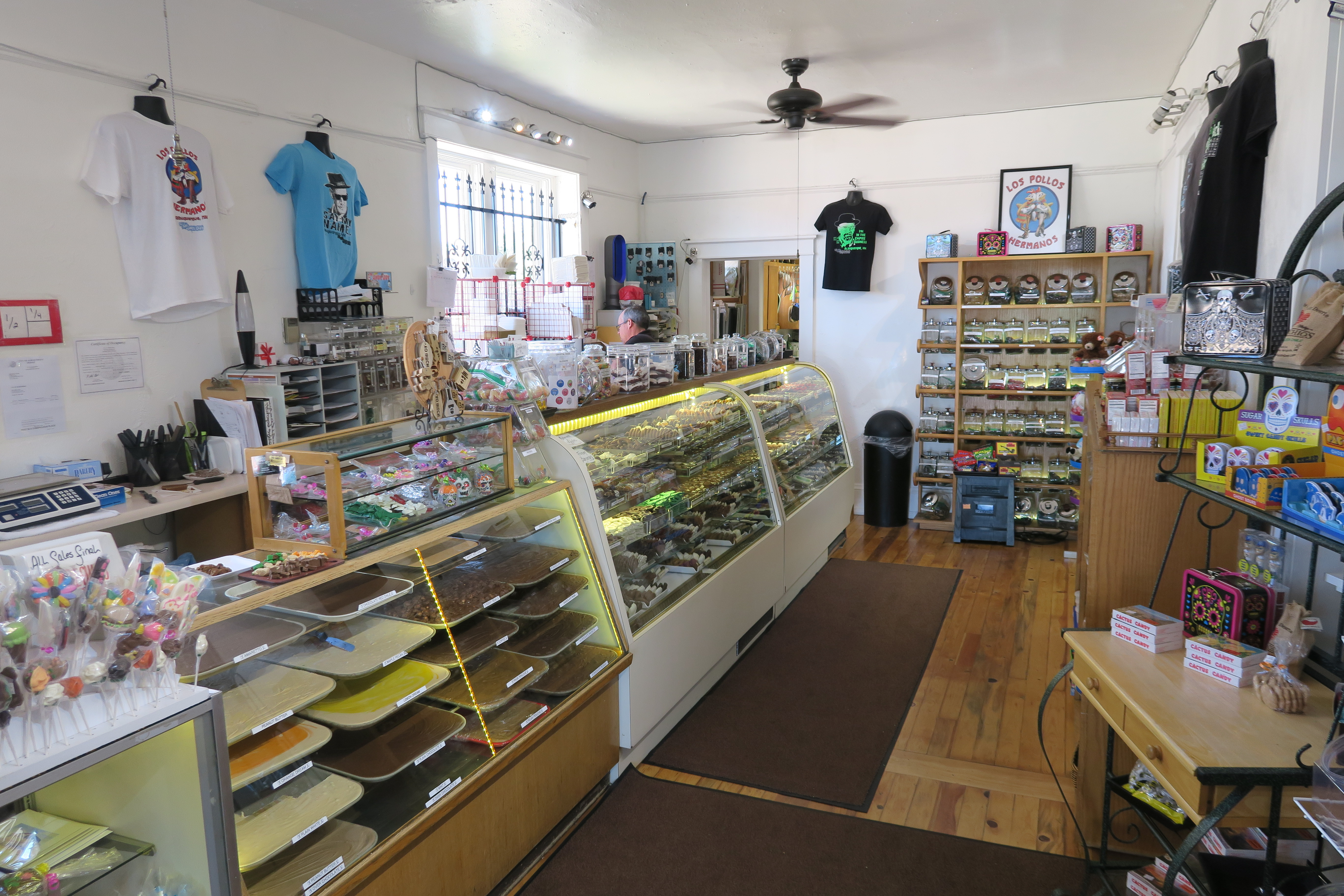
- Inside the Candy Lady
- Interactive map of The Candy Lady

Restaurant information
- Established: 1980
- Head chef: Debbie Ball
- Food type: Candy
- Dress code: Casual
- Location: 424 San Felipe St NW, Albuquerque, New Mexico, 87104, United States
- Coordinates: 35.098092°N 106.669136°W
- Website: www.thecandylady.com

The Candy Lady is a New Mexican candy store in the city of Albuquerque, New Mexico, founded in 1980.

== History ==
The original cooks were Diana Garcia Davis and her daughter Debbie. Diana was at the core of the founding of the business, and developed the candies. In 1982, the business ran into controversy as they had begun to sell adult-themed candies. The North Valley Gospel Church in Albuquerque picketed and protested the candy restaurant, which brought national attention to the restaurant from WGN-TV in Chicago to Playboy. When Diana retired her daughter Debbie continued to run the business.

== Today ==
The Candy Lady is still serving up candy. The New Mexican candy will have red or green New Mexico peppers. They also have fudge, licorice, chocolate dipped fruits, custom cakes, hard candy, rock candy, and truffles.

== In popular culture ==
On The Secret Life Of Southwest Foods the host stopped by the candy shop, and called it an "Albuquerque hotspot".

This restaurant was responsible for the creation of the methamphetamine prop used in Breaking Bad. The candy consists of a blue sugar rock candy; it is now sold at The Candy Lady as meth candy.
