= Jean Effron =

American actress (born 1932)

- Born: Jean Lois Rosenblatt; July 9, 1932 (age 94); U.S.
- Occupation: Actress
- Years active: 2004–present
- Spouse: Eugene Effron (died 2017)

Jean Lois Effron (née Rosenblatt; born July 9, 1932) is an American actress of television, film, and stage. She is best known for her recurring role as Irene Landry in the critically acclaimed AMC crime drama series Better Call Saul.

== Early life ==
Effron was born on July 9, 1932, in the United States. Before pursuing acting full-time later in life, she spent 25 years working as an office manager in a physician's medical practice. For decades, she was heavily involved in the regional and community theater scene in New Mexico, performing regularly in the city of Albuquerque.

== Career ==
Effron built an extensive background in local theater across New Mexico, taking the stage at prominent community venues such as the Albuquerque Little Theater and the Adobe Theater. Among her notable stage credits is her performance in the 2017 ensemble production of Michael Cristofer's drama The Shadow Box, directed by Frederick Ponzlov. Additionally, she has appeared in regional productions of classic plays including Driving Miss Daisy, The Laramie Project, and The Vagina Monologues.

She made her feature film debut in the 2004 drama Around the Bend. Following this, she appeared in minor roles across various cinematic projects, including the Western comedy A Million Ways to Die in the West (2014) as Elsie Stark, and the thriller Deadly Illusions (2021) as a librarian. From 2015 to 2022, she portrayed her most significant on-screen role to date, Irene Landry in the AMC series Better Call Saul. Her other television credits include guest appearances on series such as The Night Shift (2014), Briarpatch (2020), and the Nickelodeon live-action comedy The Really Loud House (2023).

== Personal life ==
She was married to Eugene Effron until his death in 2017.

== Filmography ==
- Opus (2025) – Receptionist
- The Really Loud House (2023)
- Better Call Saul (2015–2021) – Irene Landry
- Deadly Illusions (2021) – Librarian
- Briarpatch (2020) – Elderly Woman
- Interrogation (2020) – Katrina Johnson
- The Short History of the Long Road (2019) – Jean
- Stalked By My Ex (2017) – Mrs. Chen
- The Night Shift (2014)
- A Million Ways to Die in the West (2014) – Elsie Stark
- 50 to 1 (2014)
- Frank (2014)
- Pigeon Camera (2013)
- After School (2009) – Jolene
- Around the Bend (2004) – Albert's Mother
