= Ellen Sussman =

American novel writer

Ellen Sussman is a New York Times bestselling author of four novels. She was born in Trenton, New Jersey and resides in Sebastopol, California with her husband. Sussman's work features settings and characters from France to Bali to the United States. She lived in Paris from 1988 to 1993 with her first husband and two daughters.

== Career ==
Sussman attended Tufts University for her undergraduate degree and Johns Hopkins University for her graduate degree in creative writing. Jonathan Strong was her mentor and teacher while she studied at Tufts University.

Despite knowing she wanted to be a writer at age six, Sussman endured years of rejection before successfully publishing her first novel at the age of 49. In addition to writing, Sussman teaches private writing classes and workshops. One of the private classes is called "Novel in a Year" in which students write and entire novel over the course of the year with Sussman's guidance and critiques. She also teaches through Stanford Continuing Studies. Sussman is the co-founder and co-director of Sonoma County Writers Camp.

She is the founder of the Bay Area women-writers network Word of Mouth. As of 2021, there were over 170 women in the organization.

== Publications ==
=== Books ===
A Wedding in Provence (Random House, 2016)

In her most recent novel, Sussman returns to France. Provence is a city of "romance and love" for the author. France has always been a location of romance; her husband Neal Rothman and she married in France. While in France for a writer's residency in 2010, she got the idea for the novel after visiting Cassis, a sea resort in Provence.

The Paradise Guest House (Ballantine Books, 2013)

Set in Bali during the 2002 bombing in Bali, this novel deals with the subjects of terrorism, anxiety, and loss. To prepare for this novel, Sussman interviewed Balinese locals and expats on their healing after the attacks. The novel follows the actions of Jamie, a 32-year-old travel guide who was injured in the attack as she attempts to find Gabe, a man who helped her recover after the bombing.

French Lessons (Ballantine Books, 2011)

French Lessons earned the title of "People Pick" from People magazine. It became a New York Times bestseller and was sold in many countries. This novel tells the story of three attractive French Tutors and their American students as they navigate Parisian life. French Lessons has been optioned by Unique Features to be made into a movie.

On a Night Like This (Warner Books, 2004)

On a Night Like This was Sussman's first novel. Blair Clemmons is the main character. She is working as a chef in San Francisco when she learns she is dying from cancer. The novel follows Flair as she deals with terminal illness, raising a teenaged daughter, and rekindling a romance with a successful screenwriter named Luke.

=== Anthologies ===
Bad Girls (Norton, W. W. & Company, Inc., 2008)

This anthology, edited by Sussman, shares the voices of women reminiscing on their "bad girl days" and their perspectives on parenthood, success, and life. Sussman says she was inspired to create this collection because her essays were always "about her detours from the good girl path". Contributors include Sussman herself, Maggie Estep, Ann Hood, and Lolly Winston.

Dirty Words: A Literary Encyclopedia of Sex (Bloomsbury, 2008)

This anthology, edited by Sussman, contains definitions of words from "adultery" to "wet dreams" alongside essays about sex. Some authors included are: Joshua Furst, Patricia Marx, and Elissa Schappell.

=== Essays and prose ===
- "Paris is Your Mistress" A Paris All Your Own (2017)
- "Break the Rules" Breakfast on Mars (2013)
- "This is What Matters" Because I Love Her (2009)
- "Marriage Advice from the Kitchen" Good Housekeeping (2009)
- "Invite the Bitch to Dinner" The Other Woman (2007)
- "What I Gave Up" For Keeps (2007)
- "Tearing up the Sheets: A Meditation on Middle-Aged Sex" Kiss Tomorrow Hello (2006)
- "Naked Nightmare" The Thong Also Rises: Further Misadventures from Funny Women on the Road (2005)
- "How Would My Rape Shape My Kids' Lives?" Newsweek (2003)

== Awards and honors ==
=== Fellowships ===
- The Sewanee Writers Conference
- The Napoule Art Foundation
- Hedgebrook
- Brush Creek
- Ledig House
- Ucross
- Ragdale Foundation
- Writers at Work
- Wesleyan Writers Conference
- Virginia Center for the Creative Arts
- The Atlantic Center for the Arts
- Hawthornden

=== Awards ===
In 2004 and 2009, Sussman was named a San Francisco Library Laureate.

Sussman was featured in the July 2010 issue of Gentry magazine in an article titled "Life's Little Luxuries".

In 2013, Sussman was named one of the Best Local Authors in San Francisco.

== Critical response ==
The explicit language used in French Lessons caused some concern while Sussman was traveling to promote the book. She was asked not to read some of the expletives when visiting Midwestern bookstores. Additionally, some of the graphic sex scenes were questioned by book club leaders.

Paradise Guest House has been described as "A respectful and earnest but far from edgy treatment of devastation's aftermath." Largely reviews of the book have been please with the representation of the attacks and Bali's rebuilding.
