= Jonah Bobo =

American musician(born 1996 or 1997)

- Born: Ezra Jonah Bobo; New York City, New York U.S.
- Occupations: Actor; musician; theatre artist
- Years active: 2004–present (Note: 2004–2012 (actor) 2021–present (musician))
- Relatives: Salha "Mama" Bobo (great-grandmother)

Ezra Jonah Bobo (born 1996 or 1997) is an American musician and former child actor. He is best known for his roles as Danny Budwing in the 2005 film Zathura: A Space Adventure, Robbie Weaver in the 2011 film Crazy, Stupid, Love, and the voice of Austin the Kangaroo on Nickelodeon's animated television series The Backyardigans. Jonah’s full albums include: Newgrass Suite (2021), Rainbow LP (2023), and Charm School (2025). They are available on all music streaming platforms.

== Early life ==
Bobo was raised in Roosevelt Island, New York in an Orthodox Jewish household. His father works in software, while his mother is a physical therapist and personal trainer. His paternal great-grandmother was Syrian-American businesswoman and philanthropist Salha "Mama" Bobo.

== Career ==
His first film role was in The Best Thief in the World. He co-starred in Around the Bend, portraying the youngest of a four-generation family. Bobo was subsequently cast in Zathura: A Space Adventure as Danny Budwing. His next role was in Strangers with Candy. He portrayed young Victor Mancini in Choke. He has also made an appearance on 30 Rock as a paparazzo named Ethan. He appeared on Roosevelt Island in the play Seussical, Jr. at the Main Street Theatre and Dance Alliance. He was also on the 5th episode of Royal Pains. From 2004 to 2013, Bobo voiced Austin on Nickelodeon's The Backyardigans. In 2011, he appeared in Crazy, Stupid, Love as Robbie. In 2012, his final film role was in Disconnect as Ben, a lonely teenager in highschool.

Bobo is also a musician, composer and theatre artist, with his theatrical work being awarded distinctions by the Richard Rodgers Award Foundation and the Eugene O'Neill Theater Center. In September 2021, Bobo released his debut album Newgrass Suite. His second album Rainbow was released in September 2023.

== Filmography ==
=== Film ===
Year	Film	Role	Notes
2004	The Best Thief in the World	Sam Zaidman	
2004	Around the Bend	Zach Lair	
2005	Strangers with Candy	Shamus Noblet	Uncredited
2005	Zathura: A Space Adventure	Danny Budwing	
2006	The Fox and the Hound 2	Tod	Voice
2008	Choke	Young Victor Mancini	
2011	Crazy, Stupid, Love	Robbie Weaver	
2012	Disconnect	Ben Boyd	

=== Television ===
Year	Title	Role	Notes
2004–2013	The Backyardigans	Austin	Voice
2009	30 Rock	Ethan	Episode: "Jackie Jormp-Jomp"
2009	Royal Pains	Arlo Grant	Episode: "No Man Is an Island"

== Awards and nominations ==
List of awards and nominations
Award	Year	Category	Result	Work
Young Artist Award	2006	Best Performance in a Feature Film - Young Actor Age Ten or Younger	Nominated	Zathura
Young Artist Award	2012	Best Performance in a Feature Film – Supporting Young Actor	Nominated	Crazy, Stupid, Love.

== Discography ==
=== Albums ===
Album	Album details
Newgrass Suite	Released: September 3, 2021; Label: Jonah Bobo; Formats: Digital download, streaming
RAINBOW	Released: December 15, 2023; Label: Jonah Bobo; Formats: Digital download, streaming

Charm School Released: July 25, 2025 Formats: digital download, streaming

=== Singles ===
Year	Song
2021	"iii. party"
2021	"ii. woods"
2021	"vii. letter"
2022	"YELLOW"
2023	"ORANGE"
2023	"INDIGO"
2024	"BLUE PT. 1"
2024	"BLUE PT. 2"
