= Around the Bend =

- Theatrical release poster
- Directed by: Jordan Roberts
- Written by: Jordan Roberts
- Produced by: Julie Kirkham; Elliott Lewitt
- Starring: Christopher Walken; Josh Lucas; Michael Caine; Glenne Headly; Jonah Bobo
- Cinematography: Michael Grady
- Edited by: Françoise Bonnot
- Music by: David Baerwald
- Distributed by: Warner Independent Pictures
- Release date: October 8, 2004
- Running time: 85 minutes
- Country: United States
- Language: English
- Box office: $579,350

Around the Bend is a 2004 road comedy-drama film written and directed by Jordan Roberts and starring Christopher Walken, Josh Lucas, Michael Caine, Glenne Headly, and Jonah Bobo.

The film is inspired by the relationship between Roberts and the absentee, criminally insane, substance-abusing father he barely knew, Robert Stone Jordan, a self-styled indie film director/producer in his later years.

== Plot ==
Jason Lair lives with his ailing grandfather Henry, son Zach, and a live-in nurse, Katrina, from Denmark.

Jason's thieving musician father Turner darkens their doorstep after having abandoned him 30 years ago, when he was two years old and had lost his mother who had died in a car accident. Turner disappeared into addiction and Jason was left with a bum leg, so Jason is bitter with his arrival and obviously not pleased.

Henry insists on a road trip, but everyone declines, so he settles it by dying just after planning it with Zach’s help. While Jason is out at a bar, commiserating with a friend, Henry rouses himself for one last journey into the world with Zach. The old man and the boy settle into a booth at the local KFC restaurant, where Henry scribbles instructions on Post-Its and stuffs them into KFC bags, one inside another, outlining a sort of scavenger hunt. Then he dies.

Determined to bring the family together, Henry plans a 'burial' trip that all family members, his son, his grandson and his great-grandson, must partake in as terms of his will.

The opening of the KFC bag reveals Henry's plan. After being cremated along with his dog, he wants the three to make a journey from Los Angeles to New Mexico, scattering their ashes along the way. Every bag must be opened in a specific KFC restaurant, and the ashes scattered nearby.

Turner finds himself agreeing to fulfill his father's wishes, and Jason also grudgingly complies. The three survivors start out on a journey of discovery and ash-spreading. Throughout the trek, the familial bonds are re-established in Henry’s ‘tribe’ and a gradual understanding of the characters is revealed.

The first stop is local, at Henry’s wife’s grave, where Turner reads some words while playing music, and he leaves her a sandwich. They pilot a very old VW van down the desert highways from one chicken outlet to the next, faithfully consuming fried chicken at every meal.

They continue on their way to New Mexico, stopping where Henry and wife had been together, married... At a small motel, another urn of ashes is given to them. At the same time, the FBI has arrived at Henry’s. Katrina, who’s preparing to leave, is told Turner is a fugitive. Dying, he has escaped by walking out of the hospital.

When Turner discovers the last stop is Albuquerque, he tries to ditch Jason and Zach with the dog he traded for the other urn. He realizes that the real objective is to bring him to confess what he did to him.

Zach’s mom Sarah picks him up, and Jason finds out that Turner is experiencing kidney failure and living on borrowed time. Jason heads to the address given, finding him there. Turner admits he threw him when he was high, causing the limp.

On the way to the rock where Turner "knew" his wife, Jason's mother, he dies. Some time later, the last two generations of the tribe, Jason and Zach, ceremoniously spread his ashes from the rock.

== Cast ==
- Christopher Walken as Turner Lair
- Josh Lucas as Jason Lair
- Michael Caine as Henry Lair
- Glenne Headly as Katrina
- Jonah Bobo as Zach Lair
- Kathryn Hahn as Sarah
- Norbert Weisser as Walter
- David Eigenberg as John
- Gerry Bamman as Albert
- Jean Effron as Albert's Mother
- Laurie O'Brien as Ruth
- Michael O'Neill as Cowboy
- Robert Douglas Washington as College Student
- Rick Negron as KFC Manager
- Carlos A. Cabarcas as KFC Employee
- Lily Knight as Tiffany's Saleswoman

== Reception ==
=== Critical reception ===
Around the Bend received negative reviews from critics, as the film holds a 29% approval rating on Rotten Tomatoes based on 98 reviews, with an average rating of 4.9/10. The site's critics consensus reads: "Around the Bend sets a destination of earnest generational drama, but settles for the most derivative route to get there, veering off course into trite sentimentality." On Metacritic, Around the Bend holds 46 out of a 100 rank based on 31 critics, indicating "mixed or average" reviews.

Marc Savlov of The Austin Chronicle wrote "Jordan Roberts' feature debut pulls off the dizzying high-wire act of being both a misty-eyed glimpse into four generations of the men in the Lair family and a steely meditation on manhood, parenting, and the pitfalls thereof".

Despite some positivity about the film from critics, others were of different opinion. For example, Peter Hartlaub of the San Francisco Chronicle wrote that "Around the Bend would be a much bigger treat if dramas like this weren't already plentiful on cable television".

Ty Burr of The Boston Globe, stated: "Of course, audiences need and deserve tales of family reconciliation, but that doesn't make this one any less bogus at its softly fluttering heart".

Erik Lundegaard of The Seattle Times said that "The [film] sadly, wants us to be all warm and cozy. It wants to tuck us into bed. Try not to fall asleep".

Manohla Dargis of The New York Times was of the same view. She called the film as "heavily padded [and] thinly conceived", but "[still a] well-meaning movie about four generations of men".

Roger Ebert of the Chicago Sun-Times was also not impressed. His observation shows that "It's one of those films where the characters always seem to be Behaving, as if ordinary life has to be jacked up into eccentricity".

According to Eddie Cockrell of Variety the film "[has] a forced feeling of familial bonding burdened with an air of determined idiosyncrasy".

Lisa Schwarzbaum of Entertainment Weekly also chimed in favor of the negative crowd. She called the film's story as "showy", and, according to her "even stag[ed]".

=== Awards ===
- San Diego Film Festival – Best Feature Film (2004)
- Montreal World Film Festival – Special Grand Prize of the Jury (2004)
- Satellite Award for Best Supporting Actor – Motion Picture – Christopher Walken (2005)
