= Salha Bobo =

American businesswoman (1907–2001)

- Born: Salha Levy; 1907; Aleppo, Ottoman Syria
- Died: 2001 (aged 92–93); Florida, United States
- Other name: Mama Bobo
- Occupations: Businessperson; philanthropist
- Children: 7
- Relatives: Jonah Bobo (great-grandson)

Salha "Mama" Levy Bobo (née Levy; 1907–2001) was an American businesswoman, philanthropist, and matriarch of the Bobo family, based in Tampa, Florida, United States.

== Biography ==
Born in 1907 in Aleppo, Ottoman Syria, to a Jewish family. She lived there until the age of 14. She emigrated to the United States as a teenager and lived in New York City, Jacksonville, Florida, and Macon, Georgia, where her grandmother found her a husband when she was 16. She married Ralph Bobo, an Egyptian of Jewish heritage, and started in the grocery business with her husband in Georgia in 1922. The couple settled in Tampa in 1947, particularly in the Ybor City neighborhood. After they moved to Ybor City, the couple bought the Blue Ribbon Market. In 1949 three years later, Ralph died, and Salha continued to run the store with her children, later expanding to open a second store and three mini-marts. The Bobo family bought the property for the Blue Ribbon Supermarket in 1967, and later sold it to Austrian developers after operating it for decades.

In Tampa, she became locally famous as a cookbook author and businessperson. She has been the feature of numerous print and TV news stories, as well as a documentary about her life and an oral history memoir Mashala, The Life and Times of Salha Bobo. Her cooking, blending Syrian and Southern American cuisine, has been covered in publications such as the Tampa Tribune. In 2002, her first grandchild published the cookbook Mezza & More, Syrian Fare With a Southern Flair, including hundreds of her recipes.

== Family ==
Bobo died in 2001. She was noted for remembering the birthdays of all of her children, grandchildren, and her 50 great-grandchildren even in her old age. She had seven children. As of 2005, the Bobo family had 100 relatives in the Tampa Bay area. Her great-grandson is actor Jonah Bobo.
