= Disconnect (2012 film) =

- Theatrical release poster
- Directed by: Henry Alex Rubin
- Written by: Andrew Stern
- Produced by: Mickey Liddell; William Horberg; Jennifer Hilton
- Starring: Jason Bateman; Hope Davis; Frank Grillo; Michael Nyqvist; Paula Patton; Andrea Riseborough; Alexander Skarsgård; Max Thieriot; Colin Ford; Jonah Bobo
- Cinematography: Ken Seng
- Edited by: Lee Percy
- Music by: Max Richter
- Production companies: LD Entertainment; Exclusive Media Group; Wonderful Films
- Distributed by: LD Entertainment
- Release dates: September 11, 2012 (TIFF); April 12, 2013 (United States)
- Running time: 115 minutes
- Country: United States
- Language: English
- Box office: $1.5 million

Disconnect is a 2012 American psychological drama film directed by Henry Alex Rubin and written by Andrew Stern. It stars an ensemble cast featuring Jason Bateman, Hope Davis, Frank Grillo, Michael Nyqvist, Paula Patton, Andrea Riseborough, Alexander Skarsgård, Max Thieriot, Colin Ford and Jonah Bobo.

== Plot ==
The film explores how people experience the negative sides of modern communication technology by following three interconnecting stories.

The first plot goes on an ambitious, up-and-coming reporter Nina Dunham interviews an underage video chat-room stripper named Kyle. Kyle, a runaway, works for a man named Harvey in a "house" with other chat-room strippers. However, after the interview achieves some prominence, the FBI demands that she reveal the address of the house so that they can shut down the operation. Since she has paid Kyle in order to make initial contact, she may have broken the law. As a result, police and her employer also put pressure on her to cooperate. Nina wants to save him from the business, yet fears losing his trust in the process. Kyle reluctantly gives her the address, but Harvey is tipped off and the entire household flees. Nina follows them to a motel where they're staying and asks Kyle to leave with her. Kyle is willing to do so at first, but when Nina is hesitant to guarantee him safe haven in her home, he refuses. Harvey watches them argue, then slaps Nina. The entire group of chat-room strippers leave and Nina drives away in tears.

The second plot goes on two boys, Jason and his friend Frye, impersonate a girl named "Jessica Rhony" on Facebook Messenger and convince teenager Ben (the son of Rich, a lawyer for the TV station where Nina works) to send a nude picture of himself. The boys distribute it to classmates and the picture circulates to nearly everyone in their grade. Ben is so embarrassed by this cyber bullying that he attempts suicide by hanging and ends up in a coma. Rich doggedly searches Ben's social media, looking for answers, and begins chatting with "Jessica". Rich visits Ben in the hospital, where he meets Jason, who falsely calls himself Mike. Jason's father (who is actually named Mike) discovers what Jason and Frye have been doing and is furious. However, he protects his son by erasing the evidence on Frye's iPad. Later, Rich discovers the identity of "Jessica" and angrily goes to Mike's house, which results in a physical altercation. Jason tries to intervene and Rich hits him with a hockey stick. The fight ends when Mike hits Rich, who falls to the ground.

The third plot goes on a young married couple, Derek and Cindy, are still devastated due to a tragedy that occurred two years earlier: the death of their only son of SIDS. Cindy cannot stop mourning, and Derek cannot talk about their loss or deal with his feelings. One day, the couple finds their identities have been stolen online. They hire private detective Mike (Jason's father) to find the thief; after discovering that Cindy has been regularly chatting on a support group website, Mike determines who the identity thief is. Cindy and Derek go after the suspect, Stephen Schumacher, following him and even breaking into his home for evidence. Just before Derek plans to confront him at his front door, Mike calls to tell him that Schumacher is not their man, and that Schumacher too was a victim of the thief. Schumacher, who has noticed Cindy and Derek stalking him, confronts them in their car with a rifle; however, Derek, a former Marine, disarms him and forces him back into his house. Cindy is able to coax the gun away by explaining that Schumacher has been comforting her online.

The film ends without any of the stories being resolved, yet all of the characters have stopped "disconnecting" and grown closer to the ones they love.

== Cast ==
- Jason Bateman as Rich Boyd
- Hope Davis as Lydia Boyd
- Frank Grillo as Mike Dixon
- Michael Nyqvist as Stephen Schumacher
- Paula Patton as Cindy Hull
- Andrea Riseborough as Nina Dunham
- Alexander Skarsgård as Derek Hull
- Daniella Rahme as Anne Dixon
- Max Thieriot as Kyle
- Colin Ford as Jason Dixon
- Jonah Bobo as Ben Boyd
- Haley Ramm as Abby Boyd
- Norbert Leo Butz as Peter
- Kasi Lemmons as Roberta Washington
- John Sharian as Ross Lynd
- Marc Jacobs as Harvey
- Aviad Bernstein as Frye
- Teresa Celentano as Maria
- Cole Mohr as Cole
- Kevin Csolak as Shane
- Ella Lentini as Cassie
- Tessa Albertson as Isabella
- Erin Wilhelmi as Tracy

== Reception ==
=== Box office ===
Disconnect opened in a limited release on April 12, 2013 in 15 theaters and grossed $124,000 with an average of $8,267 per theater ranking #31 at the box office. The film's widest release domestically was 180 theaters and it ended up earning $1,436,900 in the United States and $70,448 internationally for a total of $1,507,310.

=== Critical response ===
Disconnect received a score of 70% on Rotten Tomatoes based on 77 reviews with an average rating of 6.7/10. The critical consensus states: "It's didactic in spots and melodramatic in others, but Disconnect's strong cast helps make it a timely, effective exploration of modern society's technological overload". The film also has a score of 64 out of 100 on Metacritic based on 24 critics indicating "generally favorable" reviews.

Richard Roeper of the Chicago Sun-Times gave the film four out of four stars, and wrote: "Even when the dramatic stakes are raised to the point of pounding music accompanying super-slow motion, potentially tragic violence, Disconnect struck a chord with me in a way few films have in recent years. I believed the lives of these people. I believed they'd do the drastic things they do in the face of crisis. I ached for them when things went terribly wrong and rooted for them when there were glimmers of hope. You should see this movie. Please...There wasn't a moment during this movie when I thought about anything other than this movie."
