= Tonight We Improvise =

Play written by Luigi Pirandello

- First edition book cover
- Original language: Italian
- Written by: Luigi Pirandello
- Characters: Doctor Hinkfuss; Lead Actress/Mommina; Lead Actor/Rico Verri; Character Actress/Signora Ignazia; Old Comic Actor/Signor Palmiro
- Series: Six Characters in Search of an Author, Each In His Own Way
- Genre: Tragicomedy
- Setting: A theatre Contemporary Sicily

Premiere
- Date: January 25, 1930
- Place: Königsberg

Tonight We Improvise (Italian: Questa sera si recita a soggetto [ˈkwesta ˈseːra si ˈrɛːtʃita a ssodˈdʒɛtto]) is a play by Luigi Pirandello. Like his plays Six Characters in Search of an Author and Each In His Own Way, it forms part of his trilogy of the theatre in the theatre.

The play premiered in 1930 in a German translation in Königsberg and had its first Italian performance in Turin on April 14, 1930.

It has been translated into English by Samuel Putnam (1932), Marta Abba (1959), and J. Douglas Campbell and Leonard Sbrocchi (1987).

== Plot synopsis ==
A company of actors under the direction of Doctor Hinkfuss is to present an improvisation on Pirandello's novella Leonora, Addio! Hinkfuss explains that his plan for having the actors improvise, as the spirit moves them, is an attempt to allow the work to stage itself, with characters rather than actors. However, his actors are frustrated at the conflict inherent in Hinkfuss's instructions: to completely become their characters, but also to come when they are called and adapt themselves to Hinkfuss's decisions about what should happen when.

After some argument between the actors and Hinkfuss, the play begins. It concerns the La Croce family – Signor Palmiro, a sulfur mine engineer, his forceful wife Signora Ignazia, and their four daughters, Mommina, Totina, Dorina, and Nenè – who have moved from Naples to the more socially conservative Sicily. The family is popular with a local company of air force officers, who love the mother and flirt with the daughters; however, this behavior earns the family the disapproval of the rest of the town, as well as of Rico Verri, one of the other officers.

One night, Signor Palmiro is brought home bleeding by a cabaret singer whom he loves, after having been stabbed defending her honor, and dies. This having coincided with a fight among the actors as to how much they should keep to the script, the Old Comic Actor's entrance is ruined, and the actors, angry at Hinkfuss's meddling, throw him out of the theatre.

The next scene takes place years later. Mommina has married Rico Verri, who is mad with jealousy over what he imagines to be her sexual history with the other officers. After he abuses her and leaves, Mommina – guided by the offstage voices of her mother and sisters – finds a handbill in his coat advertising a production of Il trovatore in which Totina, now a famous opera singer, is performing. She describes the theatre to her two children, who have never seen it, and tells them the story of the opera, singing snatches of it, with her heart beating ever faster and her breath growing ever weaker, until she sings Manrico's line in the Act IV farewell duet – Leonora, addio! – and falls dead.

The other actors end the play, running on to find Mommina dead. They believe that the Lead Actress has fainted, but she gets up, and after the actors insist on written parts, Doctor Hinkfuss, who has returned, apologizes to the audience for the night's irregularities.

== Critical reception ==
The New York Times reviewed the book version of the play, the reviewer, Percy Hutchinson, wrote, "It is the reviewer's belief that those who, not waiting for a presentation of Signor Pirandello's brilliant intellectual kit-kat, adventure through it in book form, will find them- selves not only prodded into thought but also greatly amused."
