= Each In His Own Way =

- Written by: Luigi Pirandello
- Characters: In the play: Delia Morello; Michele Rocca; Donna Livia Pelegari; Doro Pelegari, her son Diego Cenci, his friend Francesco Savio In the audience: Amelia Moreno; Baron Nuti; Theatre personnel
- Original language: Italian
- Series: Six Characters in Search of an Author, Tonight We Improvise
- Genre: tragicomedy
- Setting: a theatre in Rome characters' houses in Rome

Premiere
- Date premiered: May 22, 1924
- Place premiered: Milan

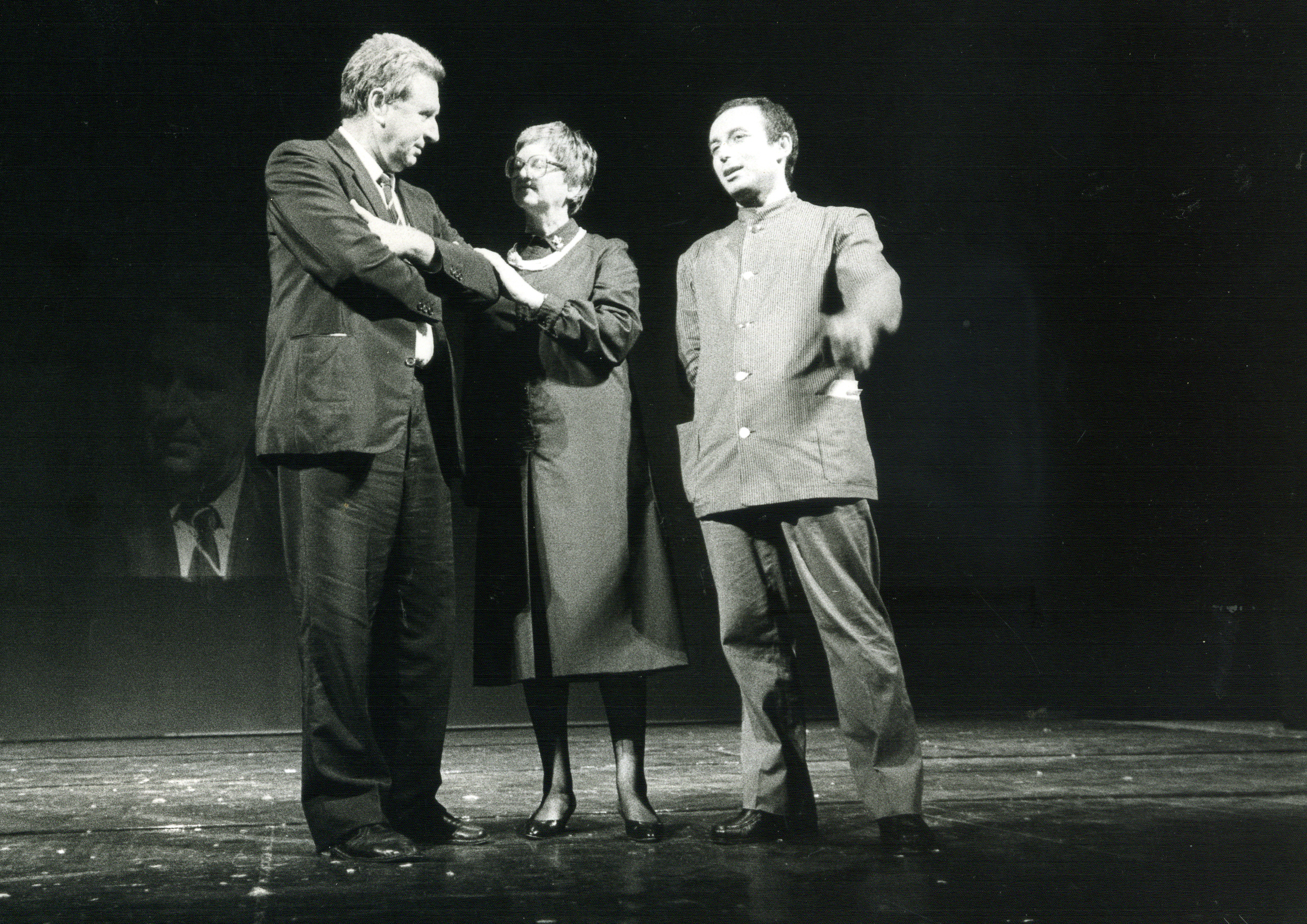

Each In His Own Way (Italian: Ciascuno a suo modo [tʃaˈskuːno a sˈsuːo ˈmɔːdo]) is a 1924 play by Luigi Pirandello. Along with Six Characters in Search of an Author, his most famous work, and Tonight We Improvise, it forms part of his "trilogy of the theatre in the theatre".

Each In His Own Way concerns the production of a play based on "real" goings-on: the scandal of the artist Giorgio Salvi's suicide on the eve of his marriage, committed when he discovered that his fiancée, the actress Delia Morello, had begun a short-lived affair with Salvi's brother-in-law Michele Rocca, is ostensibly based on events concerning the sculptor La Vela, the actress Amelia Moreno, and Baron Nuti. The people in question have come separately to see the "play" to determine if it is really based on the real events.

The "play" begins in medias res, with the characters discussing Delia. Two characters, Doro Palegari and Francesco Savio, debate her rationale: was it a well-intentioned move to break off a marriage that would have been a mistake, or was it spite against Salvi?

By the end of Act I, Moreno and Nuti have independently confirmed that the play is based on their story, and Moreno wishes to stop it from going on. However, it continues, and Act II shows Rocca's arrival to tell Delia that he has realized their mutual hatred is concealed love; she rejects him and they fight, but then she realizes he is right, and they embrace. In the auditorium, Moreno and Nuti, still furious, catch sight of each other and likewise embrace. Act III is "canceled."

== Translations into English ==
- Arthur Livingston (E. P. Dutton, 1923; Dent, 1924)
- Felicity Firth (1992)

== Adaptation ==
In 1997, the adobe theatre company produced Notions in Motion, a contemporary adaptation of Pirandello's play, written and directed by Jeremy Dobrish. The New York Times described the off-off-Broadway production as "a gleeful romp of an exercise in relativity, existential doubt, and artistic illusions."
