= Plots with a View =

2002 film by Nick Hurran

Plots with a View (Undertaking Betty)
- International theatrical poster
- Directed by: Nick Hurran
- Written by: Frederick Ponzlov
- Produced by: Michael Cowan; Suzanne Lyons; Jason Piette; Kate Robbins
- Starring: Brenda Blethyn; Alfred Molina; Naomi Watts; Lee Evans; Christopher Walken
- Cinematography: Kevin Rudge; James Welland
- Edited by: John Richards
- Music by: Rupert Gregson-Williams
- Production companies: Great British Films; Snowfall Films; Spice Factory
- Distributed by: Miramax Films
- Release date: 2002
- Running time: 88 minutes
- Country: United Kingdom
- Language: English

Plots with a View, released internationally as Undertaking Betty, is a 2002 British romantic black comedy film written by Frederick Ponzlov, directed by Nick Hurran, starring Brenda Blethyn, Robert Pugh, Alfred Molina, Naomi Watts, Lee Evans and Christopher Walken. The film began filming in Caldicot, Monmouthshire, Wales in 2002, and was released in the U.S. on 12 November 2005, with a DVD release on 7 March 2006.

== Plot ==
Boris Plots is director of Plots Funeral Home in the fictional Welsh village of Wrottin Powys. His rival Frank Featherbed, an American, is determined to revolutionise the undertaking business in Britain through the innovation of "themed funerals".

Boris dreamed of only two things as a young boy: dancing and Betty Rhys-Jones. Betty secretly loved Boris, but could not fight her father's wishes, so she was married off to a gold digger.

Giving up his dreams, Boris took over the family's undertaking business. When Betty's mother-in-law, Dillys, dies, they are thrust together again and as they discuss the funeral arrangements for Betty's mother-in-law, the old spark is rekindled.

Boris discovers that the only obstacle between their love for one another is her marriage to the adulterous Councilor Hugh Rhys-Jones. In a desperate bid for happiness Boris and Betty decide to stage her death and run away together.

At the same time, Hugh's mistress and secretary insists that they try to poison her. Before they can, Boris and Betty go through with their plan, but Frank rushes to the scene. He and Boris fight over the right to handle the funeral arrangements. After an argument and scuffle, the medical examiner said it was her dying wish to be handled by Plots.

In the church, both the mistress and Hugh talk about her, she about the affair, he gloating about inheriting all of her money. Then he insists watching while Boris seals the lid, making it impossible for Betty to sneak away.

With a lot of difficulty, Boris manages to free Betty with only Frank and his right-hand man discovering the secret. She and Boris enlist their help, after Boris and Frank agree to split the funeral business. Together they help Betty scare Hugh and the secretary (setting up the house with ghostly gadgets), who both flee.

Betty also appears as a ghost to neighbour boy Willie, whose mum passed before, telling him his mum says hi, and she loves him very much. We learn Betty leaves everything to young Willie, and an allowance to Hugh if he follows a long list of conditions. The girl goes on Jerry Springer as a haunted mistress; Betty and Boris go on the Princess cruise they were planning; their cats go too.

== Cast ==
- Brenda Blethyn as Betty Rhys-Jones
- Robert Pugh as Hugh Rhys-Jones
- Alfred Molina as Boris Plots
- Naomi Watts as Meredith Mainwaring
- Lee Evans as Delbert Butterfield
- Christopher Walken as Frank Featherbed

== Production ==
The movie was filmed on location in Wales in Monmouthshire, South Glamorgan, Vale of Glamorgan, Rhondda Cynon Taff, and Denbighshire.

The dance sequences were choreographed by Peter Darling and the costumes were designed by Ffion Elinor.

== Reception ==
The 2002 Variety review noted its "near-miraculous balance between the silly and the morbid" and referred to it as "enjoyable and entertainingly cast" even though it was "unlikely to bury the competition". In 2005, the Los Angeles Times described it as succeeding in sustaining its "deliberate silliness" though it might work better for home viewing than in theatres, and described its cast as "first rate." DVD Talk was less enthusiastic: "though kind of a mess, and not really all that funny, Undertaking Betty still feels barely recommendable, thanks to a colorful cast of true characters." Reel Film gave it 3 of 4 stars, and described it as "charming, low-key romantic comedy", and though there's "nothing especially groundbreaking or even memorable about Undertaking Betty, but the undeniably sweet vibe is ultimately quite difficult to resist."

=== Recognition ===
The film was nominated for a Golden Hitchcock at the 2002 Dinard British Film Festival, and won a Cymru Award at the 2003 BAFTA Awards, Wales.

== Home media ==
Buena Vista Home Entertainment (under the Miramax Home Entertainment banner) released the film on DVD in the US on March 7, 2006.

In December 2010, Miramax was sold by The Walt Disney Company, their owners since 1993. That same month, the studio was taken over by private equity firm Filmyard Holdings. Filmyard licensed the home media rights for several Miramax titles to Lionsgate, and Lionsgate Home Entertainment reissued the film on DVD on January 10, 2012. In 2011, Filmyard Holdings licensed the Miramax library to streaming site Netflix. This deal included Plots with a View, and ran for five years, eventually ending on June 1, 2016.

In March 2016, Filmyard Holdings sold Miramax to Qatari company beIN Media Group. Then in April 2020, ViacomCBS (now known as Paramount Skydance) bought a 49% stake in Miramax, which gave them the rights to the Miramax library. Plots with a View was among the 700 titles they acquired in the deal, with the film having been distributed by Paramount Pictures since April 2020. In late 2020, Paramount started reissuing many of the Miramax titles they had acquired, and Plots with a View was reissued on DVD by Paramount Home Entertainment around this time.

On March 4, 2021, Plots with a View was made available on Paramount's then-new streaming service Paramount+, as one of its inaugural launch titles. Paramount also included it on their free streaming service Pluto TV.
