= Joshua Furst =

American fiction writer (born 1971)

- Education: New York University Tisch School of the Arts (BFA); Iowa Writers' Workshop (MFA)
- Occupations: Writer, playwright
- Writing career
- Genre: Fiction
- Website: www.joshfurst.com

Joshua Furst is an American fiction writer and playwright. He is known for his 2007 novel The Sabotage Café.

== Early life and education ==
Joshua Furst studied as an undergraduate at New York University's Tisch School of the Arts, receiving a BFA in Dramatic Writing in 1993.

He did graduate work at the University of Iowa Writers' Workshop, from which he received an MFA with Honors in 2001.

== Career ==
=== Writing ===
Furst's novel The Sabotage Café was named to the 2007 year-end best-of lists of the Chicago Tribune, the Rocky Mountain News, and the Philadelphia City Paper, as well as being awarded the 2008 Grub Street Fiction Prize.

He is also the author of the book of stories, Short People. A frequent contributor to The Jewish Daily Forward, he has also been published in The Chicago Tribune, Conjunctions, PEN America, Five Chapters and The New York Tyrant, among many other journals and periodicals.

His plays include Whimper, Myn and The Ellipse and Other Shapes. They have been produced by numerous theatres, both in the United States and abroad, including PS122, adobe theatre company, Cucaracha Theatre, HERE, The Demarco European Art Foundation, and Annex Theatre in Seattle.

=== Teaching ===
In 2011, Furst was teaching at The New School's Eugene Lang College in New York City. and at Columbia University

== Recognition and awards ==
Furst has been given citations for notable achievement by The Best American Short Stories and The O. Henry Awards.

His work has received a 2001-2002 James Michener-Paul Engle Fellowship from the James Michener Foundation/Copernicus Society of America, a Chicago Tribune Nelson Algren Award, and a Walter E. Dakins Fellowship from the Sewanee Writers' Conference.

== Other activities ==
Furst is a founding member of the literary collective Krïstïanïa.

He helped organize and run Nada Theatre's 1995 Obie Award-winning Faust Festival and was one of the producers of the 1998 New York RAT Conference, which brought experimental theatre artists from across the United States together for a week of performance and symposia.
