= Frederick Ponzlov =

American actor

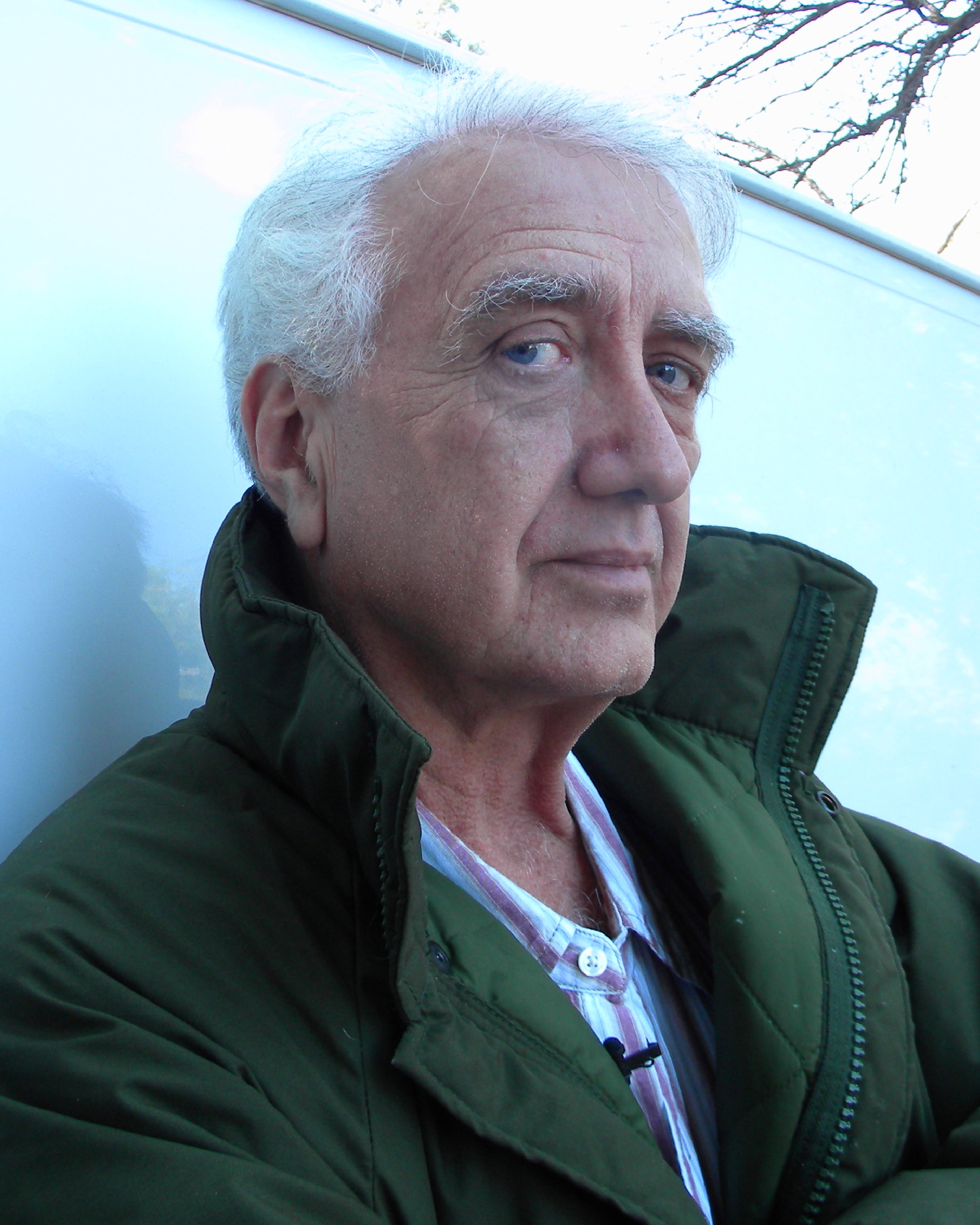
- Frederick Ponzlov - February 9, 2013
- Other names: Fredrick Ponzlov
- Occupations: Stage actor; Film actor; Television actor; Screenwriter; Theatre director; Acting teacher
- Known for: Undertaking Betty (screenplay)

Frederick (Fred) Ponzlov is an American thespian, television and film actor, screenwriter, author, theatre director, and acting teacher known for his work on stage and for writing the award-winning film Plots with a View (USA title Undertaking Betty).

== Career ==
Fred Ponzlov has been acting and directing stage work since the 1970s. He directed numerous plays at the Bellflower Theater Company and is co-founder and artistic director of the Long Beach Repertory Theatre. He was trained by Sanford Meisner of the Neighborhood Playhouse in New York City, and as a former casting director for HBO, he teaches and coaches acting classes in Long Beach, specializing in the Meisner Technique.

Ponzlov wrote Plots with a View (USA title Undertaking Betty). In 2002, Variety wrote the film is "An enjoyable and entertainingly cast fable about love, death and fitting revenge, "Plots With a View" strikes a near-miraculous balance between the silly and the morbid." When the film screened in Los Angeles in 2005, Kevin Crust of Los Angeles Times made note of "the zany spirit of Frederick Ponzlov's script." The film was nominated for a Golden Hitchcock at the 2002 Dinard British Film Festival, and won a Cymru Award at the 2003 BAFTA Awards, Wales. His book, "Solomon Speaks on Reconnecting Your Life," co-authored with Dr. Eric Pearl, has been translated into over seventeen languages.

== Critical recognition ==
The Los Angeles Times notes: Director Fred Ponzlov, who guided the recently closed "The Cherry Orchard" at the New Community Theatre of Irvine, says he is in love with the play. He worked in a production of it at Milwaukee Rep years ago and says he has seen or worked on a couple of hundred stagings. "The play is bottomless," Ponzlov says. "It's about people going through incredible changes. It sort of ties in to the coming millennium. Change is coming, and either people go with it or they can't." Indeed, the timelessness of Chekhov appeals to all these artists. His philosophies, so pertinent 100 years ago, still resonate at the end of this century.

Of his work as one of the news anchors in the 2008 play Tragedy: A Tragedy, Hoyt Hilsman of Backstage wrote "The actors do solid work here, notably Ponzlov as the anchor and McCray as a field reporter." and LA Weekly theater critics wrote "Gifted with gravitas and eloquence, the four graveyard-shift journalists in Pulitzer finalist Will Eno's sharp satire on round-the-clock spin are honing panic that the sun has set and may never rise again", Of his performance in Much Ado at the 1978 Colorado Shakespeare Festival, where director Edgar Reynolds reset the original Shakespeare play Much Ado about Nothing into the American Southwest, William Babula of Shakespeare Quarterly wrote the character of "Dogberry was played as the 'gringo', a somewhat anachronistic Texan with badge, six-guns, cowboy hat, spurs, and drawl. The role was handled admirably by Frederick Ponzlov, and it was amusing to observe the working-class Mexicans of the 'Watch' trying to make sense of the 'gringo' before deciding he was a fool.".

== Filmography ==
- Celebrity (1984) (TV miniseries)
- Fatal Vision (1984) (TV movie)
- Murder, She Wrote (2 episodes, 1985–1986) (TV)
- Strange Voices (1987) (TV movie)
- Laguna Heat (1987) (TV movie)
- Turner & Hooch (1989)
- L.A. Law (1 episode, 1989) (TV)
- Locked Up: A Mother's Rage (1991) (TV movie)
- Full Eclipse (1993) (TV movie)
- What's Love Got to Do with It (1993)
- Ancient Prophecies (1994) (TV movie)
- Death Benefit (1996) (TV movie)
- Ally McBeal (1 episode, 1999) (TV)
- The Dismissal (2008)
- Forfeit of Grace (2009)
- Situational Awareness (2013)

== Recognition ==
- 2010, nominated for 'Best Actor' at Method Fest Independent Film Festival for his role in Forfeit of Grace
