= Adobe theatre company =

Theatre company in New York City, US

Adobe theatre company (stylized as 'adobe theatre was an off-off-Broadway theatre that operated from 1991 to 2004 in New York City, producing original plays aimed at Generation X audiences. Led by artistic director Jeremy Dobrish and producing director Christopher Roberts, the company’s critical and popular successes included Notions in Motion (1997) and Duet! A Romantic Fable (1998).

== Theatrical style and mission ==
Founded in 1991 by graduates of Wesleyan University, the adobe theatre company (written in lowercase letters) described itself as

'a collective of theatre artists dedicated to creating productions that utilize the uniquely interactive and communal possibilities of live theatre. adobe shows draw on many influences ranging from high art to pop culture, fairy tales to urban myths, and traditional theatre to modern performance art. In an effort to demystify theatre and make it more accessible to a younger audience, adobe productions begin the moment you enter the theatre and don't end until after everyone is invited to the stage to share drinks and conversation.'

Adobe staged at off-off-Broadway venues such as the Soho Rep, Ohio Theatre, and Flea Theatre. Critics praised them as «a brash ingenious young group with a nervy iconoclastic voice” and “one of the canniest theatre companies anywhere in town.» They were described as a «Gen X theatre company» that appealed to younger audiences with their «fiendishly inventive» theatricality and «appealingly adolescent energy», as well as low ticket prices, a pay-what-you-will open bar, and a party onstage after every performance.

== Plays by Jeremy Dobrish ==
adobe theatre company first gained the attention of mainstream critics with their production of Blink of an Eye (1995), written and directed by Jeremy Dobrish. New York Times theatre critic Ben Brantley described the play as “a giddy detective story [that] suggests Pirandello on Prozac, recasting his usual mind games in the cheery terms of a Mad magazine parody.” Two years later, Dobrish staged Notions in Motion (1997), a contemporary adaptation of Pirandello’s Each in His Own Way, which Brantley praised as “a gleeful romp of an exercise in relativity, existential doubt and artistic illusions.” Notions in Motion transferred to a limited run off-Broadway at the Greenwald Theatre.

Dobrish also wrote the plays, The Handless Maiden (1998), which wove Brothers Grimm characters into the contemporary world, and Orpheus and Eurydice (2000), a rock-and-roll retelling of the classical Greek myth. American Theatre magazine wrote, “In plays like Orpheus and The Handless Maiden, Dobrish has proven adept at knitting together a comic tissue of contemporary realities, in which the tiny bright threads of myth and fairy tale adhere and are interwoven with recognizable parallels within modern-day relationships. There is pathos, too, layered with the zingy laughs.” Other adobe theatre company productions written by Dobrish include Deception (2003) and Superpowers (2004).

== Duet! A Romantic Fable ==
The company’s greatest commercial success was Duet! A Romantic Fable (1998), a spoof of 1950s Hollywood romantic melodramas written by and starring Erin Quinn Purcell and Gregory Jackson, with songs by Michael Garin. The New York Times hailed it as “another welcome act of subversion by the young, talented players at Adobe,” with theatre columnist Steven Drukman describing the show as “poised somewhere between Saturday morning cartoons and Saturday Night Live as directed by David Lynch, and geared to an audience weaned on television.” Duet! transferred to the Actors’ Playhouse, co-produced with Dodger Endemol Theatricals, running off-Broadway from September 7 to December 20, 1998.

== Other major works ==
adobe staged several plays written by Jeff Goode, including The Eight: Reindeer Monologues (1995/2001), Larry and the Werewolf (1998), Poona The F*#kdog (1999) featuring Peter Dinklage, and Prague-Nosis (2002). The company also produced plays by company member Jay Reiss, including Two Men Poised (1995) and Meanwhile, on the Other Side of Mount Vesuvius (1999) featuring Maggie Siff. Company members collaboratively devised the showbiz parody Hooray for Iceboy (2001). While the majority of adobe’s productions was directed by Dobrish, other directors working with the company included Lance Ball, Jessica Irons, Edward Elefterion, Stephen Haff, Damon Kiely, Elyse Singer, and Paul Zablocki.

Recurring “off-night” events included the Adobe Variety Hour, featuring the fictional cabaret duo Roz Holiday and Bobby Carmichael (Kathryn Langwell and Vin Knight); the “Fleet the Time” short play series, curated by Julie Bleha; and a 24-Hour Play Festival.

== Awards and grants ==
A Fish Story (1999), created by Erin Quinn Purcell, Gregory Jackson, and Michael Garin, was the winner of a Jonathan Larson Grant. adobe theatre company was also supported by major grants from the Jerome Foundation, Peter Jay Sharp Foundation, and New York State Council for the Arts.

== Company members ==
- Arthur Aulisi (actor)
- Lance Ball (associate director)
- Sarah Bittenbender (stage manager)
- Henry Caplan (actor)
- Steven Capone (set designer)
- Jeremy Dobrish (artistic director)
- Frank Ensenberger (actor)
- Michael Garin (composer/lyricist)
- Meganne George (costume designer)
- Michael Gottlieb (lighting designer)
- Arthur Halpern (actor)
- Vin Knight (actor)
- Kathryn Langwell (actor)
- Matthew Maraffi (set designer)
- Christopher Marobella (actor)
- Stephanie McCormick (stage manager)
- J. Mole (video designer)
- Janice O’Rourke (actor)
- Erin Quinn Purcell (actor)
- Alex Radocchia (lighting designer)
- Jay Reiss (playwright)
- Molly Renfroe (actor)
- Christopher Roberts (producing director)
- Jay Rosenbloom (actor)
- Beau Ruland (actor)
- Jordan Schildcrout (literary manager/dramaturg)
- Dave Slivken (actor)
- Chris Todd (sound designer)
- Joe West (actor)
- Paul Ziemer (lighting designer)

== Publications ==
Jeremy Dobrish. Plays by Jeremy Dobrish: Blink of an Eye, The Handless Maiden, and Notions in Motion. New York: Broadway Play Publishing, 1999.

Jeremy Dobrish. Orpheus and Eurydice. New York: Broadway Play Publishing, 2001.

Jeremy Dobrish. Super Powers. New York: Broadway Play Publishing, 2005.

Jeff Goode. The Eight: Reindeer Monologues. New York: Samuel French, 1997.

Jeff Goode. Larry and the Werewolf. New York: Broadway Play Publishing, 2006.

Gregory Jackson and Erin Quinn Purcell. Duet! New York: Broadway Play Publishing, 2001.
