= Saul Gone =

- Better Call Saul episode
- Promotional poster
- Episode no.: Season 6 Episode 13
- Directed by: Peter Gould
- Written by: Peter Gould
- Cinematography by: Marshall Adams
- Editing by: Skip Macdonald
- Original air date: August 15, 2022
- Running time: 69 minutes

Guest appearances
- Barbara Rosenblat as Judge Samantha Small; Peter Diseth as Bill Oakley; Julie Pearl as ADA Suzanne Ericsen; Stephen Conrad Moore as U.S. Marshal; Rusty Schwimmer as Legal Aid lawyer; Bob Jesser as AUSA George Castellano; Todd Terry as SAC Austin Ramey; Marisilda Garcia as Blanca Gomez; Carol Burnett as Marion; Bryan Cranston as Walter White; Michael McKean as Chuck McGill; Betsy Brandt as Marie Schrader

Episode chronology
← Previous "Waterworks"	Next → —
- Better Call Saul season 6

"Saul Gone" is the series finale of the American legal crime drama television series Better Call Saul, which is a spin-off of Breaking Bad. The episode is the thirteenth episode of the sixth season and the series' 63rd episode overall. Written and directed by Peter Gould, who co-created the series with Vince Gilligan, the episode first aired on AMC and AMC+ on August 15, 2022, before debuting online in certain territories on Netflix the following day.

"Saul Gone" is primarily set in late 2010, with flashbacks set during Breaking Bad and Better Call Saul. It depicts Jimmy McGill / Saul Goodman (Bob Odenkirk) facing the consequences of the conflicts caused by his three identities: his actions throughout Better Call Saul under his birth name, the federal crimes he committed for Walter White (Bryan Cranston) throughout Breaking Bad as Saul Goodman, and the schemes he ran in Omaha, Nebraska, as Gene Takavic. The episode also sees Jimmy and Kim Wexler (Rhea Seehorn) meeting for the first time in six years.

Gould and the Better Call Saul writing staff knew by the time the fifth season finale aired in 2020 that the series would end with Jimmy going to prison for his actions in Breaking Bad. They sought to differentiate "Saul Gone" from Breaking Bad's "Felina" (2013) and El Camino: A Breaking Bad Movie (2019) with a slower pace and greater focus on dialogue. Several actors from Better Call Saul and Breaking Bad returned for guest appearances, including Bryan Cranston as Walter White, Betsy Brandt as Marie Schrader, and Michael McKean as Chuck McGill.

An estimated 1.80 million household viewers watched this episode when it was first broadcast on AMC. "Saul Gone" received widespread acclaim, with critics praising Jimmy's character development and his reconciliation with Kim. Many considered it a "masterful" conclusion to the series and one of the best series finales of all time.

== Plot ==
In flashbacks, Jimmy McGill / Saul Goodman asks Mike Ehrmantraut (Note: Set after the opening of "Bad Choice Road".) and Walter White (Note: During the events of the Breaking Bad episode "Granite State".) what they would do if they could travel back in time. Mike says he would stop himself from taking his first bribe, while Walt says he would have stayed at Gray Matter Technologies. Jimmy tells Mike he would have invested in Berkshire Hathaway and tells Walt he regrets injuring his knee during a scam. Mike and Walt each chastise Jimmy for his shallow answer. In another flashback, (Note: Before the events of Better Call Saul.) Chuck McGill tries to bond with Jimmy over his budding law practice, but Jimmy brushes him off. Chuck says there is nothing wrong with considering a different path but Jimmy says Chuck never did. As Jimmy leaves, Chuck picks up a copy of The Time Machine by H. G. Wells, remarking "We always end up having the same conversation, don't we?"

In 2010, Saul attempts to flee, (Note: Set after Marion reports Saul in "Waterworks".) but is apprehended by Omaha police. He is extradited to Albuquerque, New Mexico and chooses to represent himself while hiring Bill Oakley as advisory counsel. With Saul facing a life sentence plus 190 years for helping Walt build his methamphetamine empire, Bill negotiates a plea bargain with a 30-year sentence. Marie Schrader objects and accuses Saul of complicity in the murders of Hank Schrader and Steven Gomez. (Note: As depicted in the Breaking Bad episode "Ozymandias".) Saul convinces the lead assistant U.S. attorney that he could deadlock a jury by portraying himself as Walt's victim, resulting in a deal that reduces his prison time to seven and a half years. Saul attempts to gain further concessions by offering information about Howard Hamlin's death, (Note: As depicted in "Plan and Execution".) unaware that Kim Wexler has already done so. (Note: As depicted in "Waterworks".) Saul learns that Howard's widow Cheryl may file a civil lawsuit against Kim. In a U.S. Marshal's presence, he tells Bill that he has information to share regarding his and Kim's involvement in Howard's death.

In Florida, Kim volunteers at a pro bono legal services firm. Prosecutor Suzanne Ericsen calls to warn that Saul's testimony could affect her. Kim attends the sentencing in Albuquerque, where Saul admits he lied about her involvement so she would be present. He confesses to enabling Walt and admits his role in Chuck's suicide before stating that his name is James McGill, not Saul Goodman. (Note: In the third season of Better Call Saul, Chuck commits suicide after Jimmy gets his malpractice insurance canceled. Jimmy's efforts to get Chuck's insurance cancelled are depicted in the episode "Expenses", while Chuck's death is depicted in the episode "Lantern".) He is sentenced to 86 years and fellow inmates revere him as Saul. Kim visits and they share a cigarette. As she departs, Jimmy gestures finger guns. (Note: As seen in "Winner".)

== Production ==
=== Development ===
"Saul Gone" is the series finale of Better Call Saul, and was written and directed by series co-creator and showrunner Peter Gould. Gould wrote the Breaking Bad episode "Better Call Saul", which introduced the character Saul Goodman, and co-created the spin-off with Vince Gilligan. Gould and Gilligan initially served as co-showrunners before Gilligan left the writers' room to focus on other projects, resulting in Gould becoming the sole showrunner.

In the week leading up to the finale's premiere, Gilligan stated that the episode would likely be the last entry in the Breaking Bad franchise, as he and Gould were both ready to move on to new stories. Gould later acknowledged that by the time Breaking Bad ended, he and Gilligan were already developing the spin-off, but by the time Better Call Saul's finale aired, the two were working on other projects.

=== Casting ===
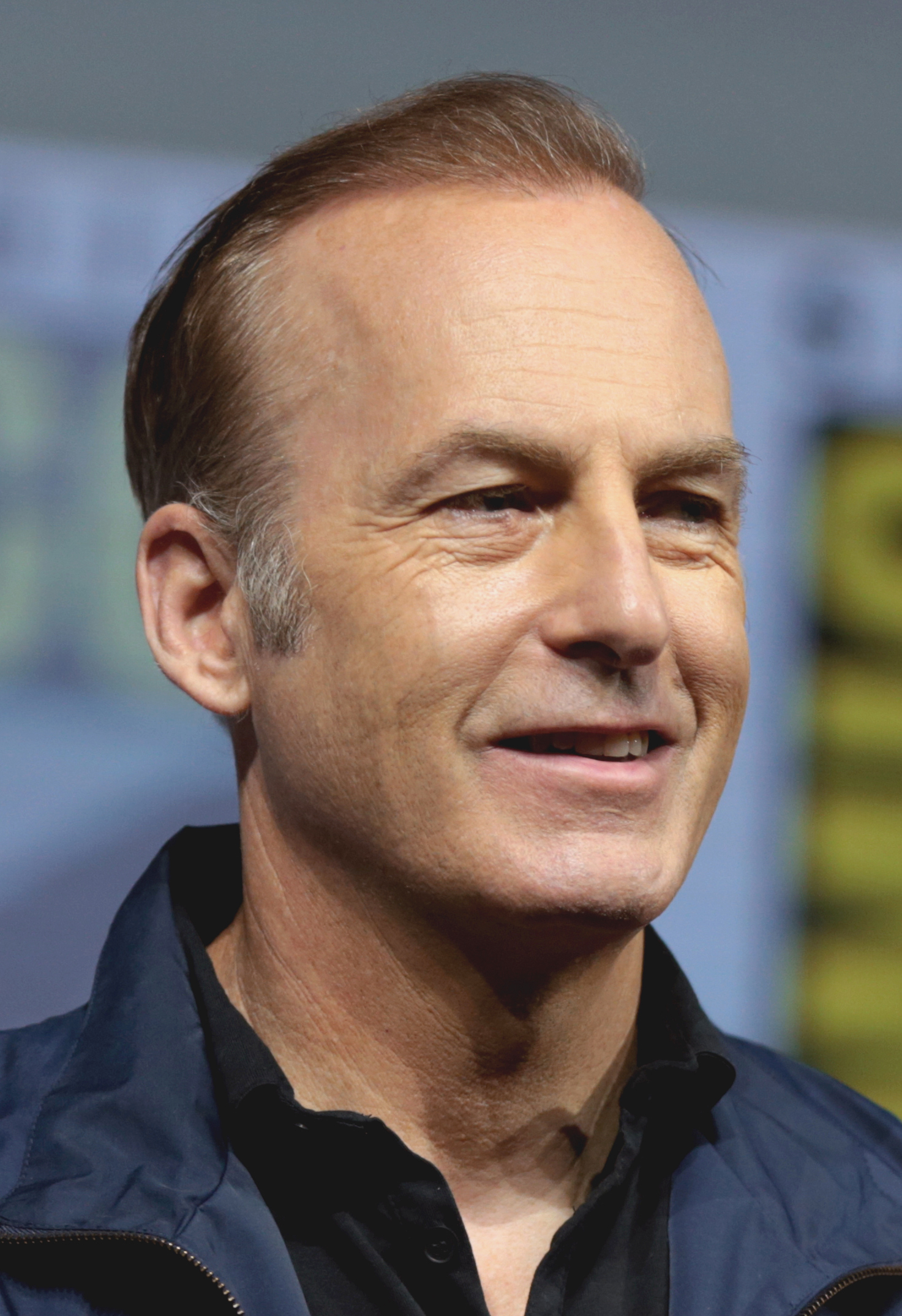
"Saul Gone" marked the end of Bob Odenkirk's character, Saul Goodman, a role Odenkirk had portrayed since the second season of Breaking Bad.

Bob Odenkirk, Jonathan Banks, and Rhea Seehorn are the only cast members listed in the starring credits. Gould considered the finale a mix of the world of Better Call Saul and Breaking Bad characters, as the episode featured several returning actors from both series. This included Banks as Mike Ehrmantraut (Note: Who had only appeared in one scene since "Fun and Games") and guest stars Bryan Cranston as Walter White, (Note: Who had appeared in the episode "Breaking Bad" two episodes prior) Michael McKean as Chuck McGill, (Note: Who was written out of the series after "Lantern" but made special appearances in "Piñata" and "Winner") and Betsy Brandt as Marie Schrader. (Note: Who had not appeared since the Breaking Bad episode "Felina", which aired nine years prior) The episode also marked the first appearance of Steven Gomez's wife Blanca, portrayed by Marisilda Garcia, who was referenced multiple times but unseen in Breaking Bad. Gould wanted to bring back other Better Call Saul actors, such as Giancarlo Esposito, Patrick Fabian, and Michael Mando, as well as others that appeared on Breaking Bad, including Anna Gunn, RJ Mitte, and Dean Norris. However, wanting to avoid an "overstuffed epic", he and the writing staff decided against incorporating them into the finale.

Banks, Cranston and McKean's characters appear in flashbacks, whereas Brandt's character appears in the present timeline. Gould compared the scenes with Mike, Walter and Chuck to the three ghosts of A Christmas Carol, each showing Saul repeating the same cycle in his life. He also felt Chuck's cameo appearance brought the show back to its beginning. McKean filmed his scene before traveling to the United Kingdom for another project, Cranston's appearance was filmed months before principal photography for the finale began to accommodate his schedule, while Brandt spent a relatively longer time in Albuquerque due to having more scenes to film than the other guest stars.

=== Writing ===
The title of "Saul Gone" is a play on the words "s'all gone" and Saul Goodman's name. The episode, season, series, and franchise ends with Gene Takavic getting caught by the authorities and, under his legal name of Jimmy McGill, getting sentenced to prison for the crimes he committed in Breaking Bad. Gould and the writing staff knew by the time the fifth season finale aired two years prior that this was the right ending for the series. They realized that Saul spent his career making a mockery of the justice system, so it was fitting to them that he ended the series as a part of it, only this time as a prisoner. Gould further elaborated that in the finale, Saul had gone from someone who ran the courtroom to becoming the subject of one.

Gould and the writing staff felt strongly to end Better Call Saul differently than Breaking Bad and its sequel film El Camino (2019). Comparing the fates of the three works' main protagonists, Gould explained that Walter White achieved his ambitions but lost his life, Jesse Pinkman suffered greatly but found freedom, while Saul Goodman chose long-term incarceration but regained his soul. Saul's fate at the end of "Saul Gone" was nearly assigned to Jesse. While writing El Camino years prior, Gilligan toyed with the idea of ending the film with Jesse residing in a jail cell, imprisoned yet at peace. However, when Gilligan initially pitched this idea to Better Call Saul writing staff, they advised against it on the grounds that Jesse had suffered too much to be incarcerated, while Gould also felt this was a more appropriate ending for Saul. When comparing the finale of Breaking Bad to the finale of Better Call Saul, Gould said he felt that Walter dealt death to people, so his series ended "in a blaze of glory"; in contrast, Gould believed Saul was a man of words, and that his ending needed to be more dialogue-focused. Odenkirk described the ending as being "more psychological and quieter and slower. It's deeply about character".

However, Gould considered Better Call Saul's ending an optimistic one, not just for Saul Goodman, but for Kim Wexler as well. Acknowledging her predicament in Florida, Gould stated that Kim was hiding from responsibility for her decisions in Albuquerque, but that Jimmy's phone call liberated her to face the consequences of her actions. With the two characters finally confessing their misdeeds, Gould felt both chose to end their cycles of self-destructive tendencies and would refrain from making the same mistakes again. He further acknowledged the challenging circumstances that awaited the two characters, with Saul spending his life in prison and Kim potentially facing a civil lawsuit, but Gould believed that in cleaning their conscience, both regained a part of their humanity and could begin living more honest lives.

The writers room discussed the idea of having the prison room scene of Jimmy and Kim sharing a cigarette be the last shot of the series. However, Gould did not want the show to end with Jimmy and Kim together in the same frame, feeling it more honest to finish with the two of them apart. He instead chose to end the series with the two parting in the prison yard to deal with the likely truth that Jimmy will be incarcerated for the rest of his life. Gould also said that whether Kim would return to visit Jimmy again was up to the audience to decide. Odenkirk would later state that if the character were to have a continuation story, it would have to take place in prison during his sentence. Gilligan later speculated that Jimmy would receive a pardon from president Donald Trump and go back to selling infomercials, while Kim likely returned to public defending.

=== Filming ===
When filming the opening scene in the desert, Gould mentioned the location's cold weather conditions strongly contrasted with the blazing heat that occurred when shooting the episode "Bagman", which took place in the same setting. The very first two shots of the rocks and Jimmy's car in the desert came from unused footage from previous episodes. For the courtroom scene, production staff initially struggled to find a location, but were eventually granted permission by the New Mexico Supreme Court to film on the top floor of their building. The location was only available on weekends, resulting in the entire crew shifting their working week to Wednesday through Sunday. Filming lasted three days on the scene; Odenkirk mentioned asking to reshoot the scene after initially completing it. To help film Chuck's flashback scene, production designer Denise Pizzini had to rebuild the set for Chuck's house on stage, as it was previously destroyed during the fourth season.

The prison room scene in "Saul Gone" (top) was a homage to the series premiere (bottom). It was the last scene filmed during principal photography.

Jimmy and Kim sharing a cigarette while leaning against a prison room wall was the last scene filmed during principal photography for the series. Gould considered the moment, which itself was an homage to the first episode, as the two characters relating to one another without speaking. Odenkirk detailed the scene as being a "big deal for us, and it felt incredibly organic and natural, the feelings of acceptance and love at a level they've never shared before", furthermore describing the two characters as "bigger people than they had shown themselves to be, and that scene grants them that intelligence as well as the bravery to do that – to own their shortcomings". While the scene was filmed in black-and-white, as with all other parts of the Gene timeline, a brief use of color on the cigarette and lighter flame was included. Gould said this use of color was a sign of Jimmy recalling his fondness for his relationship with Kim. The scene's music was reused from the first episode, which was Dave Porter's first composition for Better Call Saul.

During the final scene in the prison yard, many viewers noticed Kim's right hand subtly gesturing a gun in response to Jimmy shooting finger guns at her. Footage was filmed of Kim returning Jimmy's gesture by fully shooting finger guns back at him, but Gould felt that this could be interpreted as Kim going back to her old ways. As a result, the scene that made it to air showed Kim merely looking at Jimmy instead. Seehorn described the overall scene as being "about the acknowledgement of their bond that is still there, and the part of their relationship that was true".

== Themes and motifs ==
During the scene at Chuck's house, Chuck picks up a paperback copy of H. G. Wells's The Time Machine. The book was previously visible in the prologue opening of the season premiere "Wine and Roses", when authorities raid Saul Goodman's mansion after he flees Albuquerque, and in the episode that would succeed it, "Carrot and Stick", where it is present on Jimmy's bedroom nightstand at Kim's apartment. Its placement is intended to illustrate the regrets several characters feel over their actions, including Jimmy, Kim, Walt, and Mike. In Jimmy's case, The Time Machine and his questions about time travel reveal his biggest regret was the way his relationship with Chuck ended, which he did not resolve until his courtroom confession. Showrunner Peter Gould suggested that Chuck having a copy of The Time Machine in the flashback scene implied that he too was experiencing regrets around this period.

When Saul asks Walt about his greatest regret in the flashback showing their time in Ed Galbraith's hideout, Walt briefly glances at the wristwatch that Jesse gave him in the Breaking Bad episode "Fifty-One" (2012). Rae Torres of Collider felt this indicated that Walt's greatest regret was not leaving Gray Matter Technologies but rather his abusive treatment of Jesse throughout Breaking Bad, and served to contrast with Saul's inability to honestly answer his own question.

== Reception ==
=== Critical response ===
"Saul Gone" received universal critical acclaim. On the review aggregator Rotten Tomatoes, the episode received an approval rating of 100%, based on 30 reviews, with an average rating of 10/10. The critical consensus reads: "The lawyer who broke bad finally comes clean in 'Saul Gone', an emotionally powerful and thematically fitting conclusion to one of television's great dramas." The episode is considered by numerous critics to be a "masterful" conclusion to the series, while TVLine ranked it as one of the best series finales of all time. Many critics highlighted Jimmy's character development, redemption, and reconciliation with Kim, in addition to the motif of time machines in the episode. (Note: Attributed to multiple references:)

Giving the episode an A grade, Kimberly Potts of The A.V. Club called it a "supremely satisfying sendoff" with "blasts from the past and one last twist". At IGN, Rafael Motamayor gave the episode a 10 out of 10 rating, describing it as a "subtler character study, exploring regrets and change in its protagonist". He also noted the episode title and complimented it for being "a thematic bookend on a show that was never really about Saul Goodman" and highlighted the motif of time machines. Similarly, Vulture's Jen Chaney also discussed the motif of time machines in the episode, and commended it for offering more depth and context to Breaking Bad, and felt the series was superior to Breaking Bad, as it "dared to widen its scope and go bigger than Breaking Bad ever did". Additionally, the website's Scott Tobias gave it a 5 out of 5 rating and wrote, "'Saul Gone' [...] finds an ending for Jimmy that's hopeful and authentic without feeling rosy or unearned." Meanwhile, David Segal of The New York Times felt Saul's discussions with Mike, Walter, and Chuck about time machines helped "riff on the theme of regret and second chances".

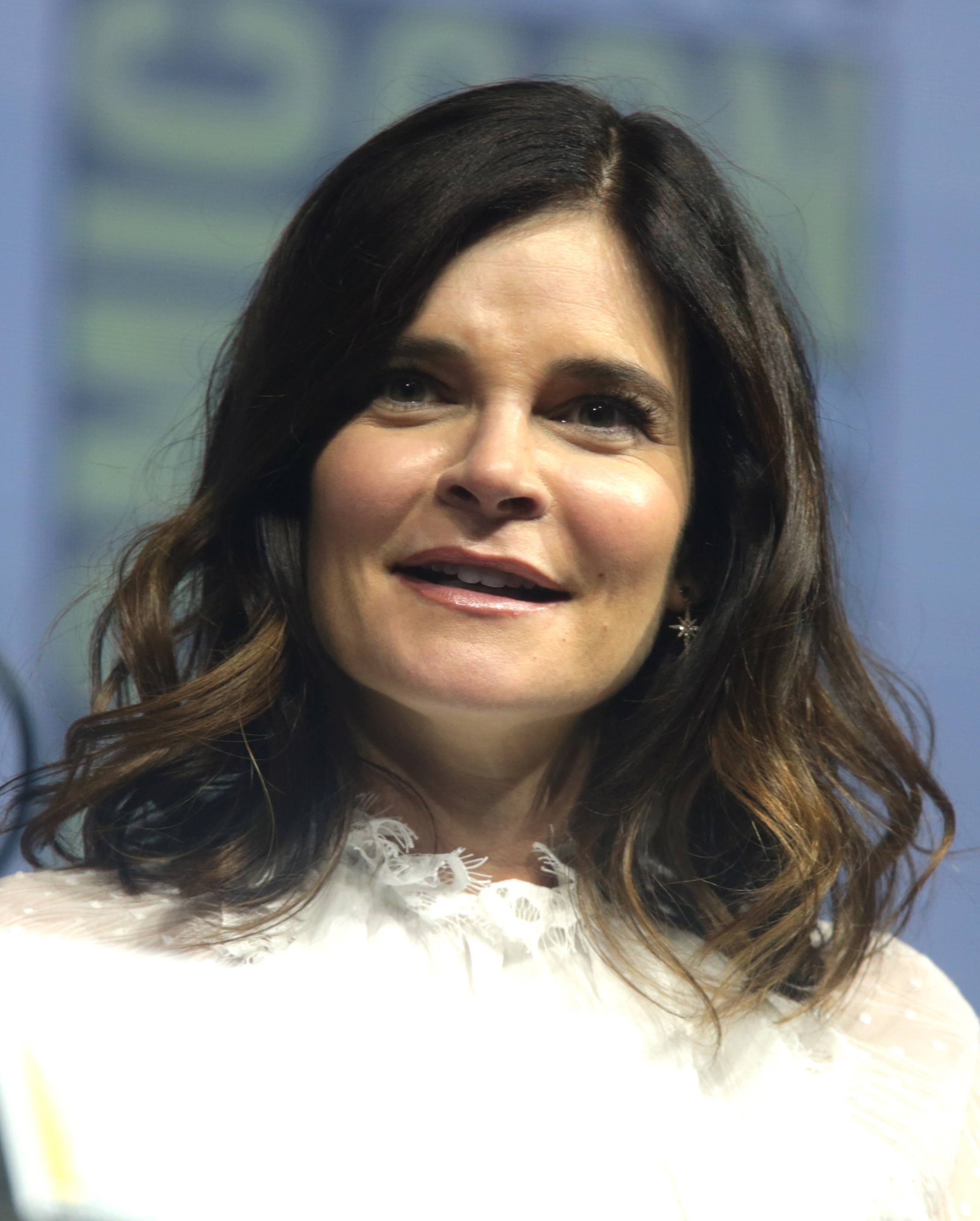
Betsy Brandt's surprise return as Marie Schrader, who last appeared nine years prior in Breaking Bad's finale, drew praise.

Miles Surrey of The Ringer discussed the scene in which Jimmy testifies before court, and highlighted the inner conflict between his Jimmy McGill and Saul Goodman personae, ultimately feeling Jimmy won, as he had realized "the prospect of reconciling with [Kim] takes him on a new path—one toward redemption". He praised Jimmy's characterization in the episode, and felt that the series "showed that it's never too late to stop breaking bad for the ones you love". At Variety, Daniel D'Addario highlighted Odenkirk's performance in the court scene, and felt the episode was "meticulous" and commended Gould's writing and narrative structure. He felt that the episode was superior to Breaking Bad's series finale, "Felina". James Osborne of The A.V. Club commended the return of Betsy Brandt as Marie Schrader, saying that despite audiences sympathizing with Jimmy over the course of Better Call Saul's six seasons, Marie's appearance served as a reminder of how his actions on Breaking Bad directly affected her and as to why he was in the courtroom in the first place.

=== Accolades ===
The episode was chosen by Odenkirk to support his nomination for Outstanding Lead Actor in a Drama Series at the 75th Primetime Emmy Awards.

Award	Category	Nominee(s)	Result	Ref.
American Society of Cinematographers Awards	Episode of a One-Hour Commercial Television Series	Marshall Adams	Nominated	
Cinema Audio Society Awards	Outstanding Achievement in Sound Mixing for Television Series – One Hour	Phillip W. Palmer, Larry Benjamin, Kevin Valentine, Chris Navarro, and Stacey Michaels	Won	
Golden Reel Awards	Outstanding Achievement in Sound Editing – Broadcast Long Form Dialogue / ADR	Nick Forshager, Kathryn Madsen, and Jane Boegel	Nominated	
Primetime Emmy Awards	Outstanding Writing for a Drama Series	Peter Gould	Nominated	
Primetime Creative Arts Emmy Awards	Outstanding Picture Editing for a Drama Series	Skip Macdonald	Nominated	
Primetime Creative Arts Emmy Awards	Outstanding Sound Mixing for a Comedy or Drama Series (One Hour)	Larry Benjamin, Kevin Valentine, and Phillip W. Palmer	Nominated	

=== Ratings ===
An estimated 1.80 million household viewers watched "Saul Gone" during its first broadcast on AMC on August 15, 2022. This made the finale the series' most-watched episode since the third season finale, "Lantern", which aired five years prior. Including delayed viewing totals gave the final tally a total of 2.7 million viewers on AMC.

Upon the episode's initial release on AMC+, the network's streaming platform, the app experienced an outage, causing many users to be logged out. AMC later reported that first-day viewing numbers for the finale on AMC+ was four times as big as the season premiere and called the final season of Better Call Saul the highest acquisition driver in the history of the streaming service.
