= Flashback (narrative) =

Interjected scene that takes a narrative back in time

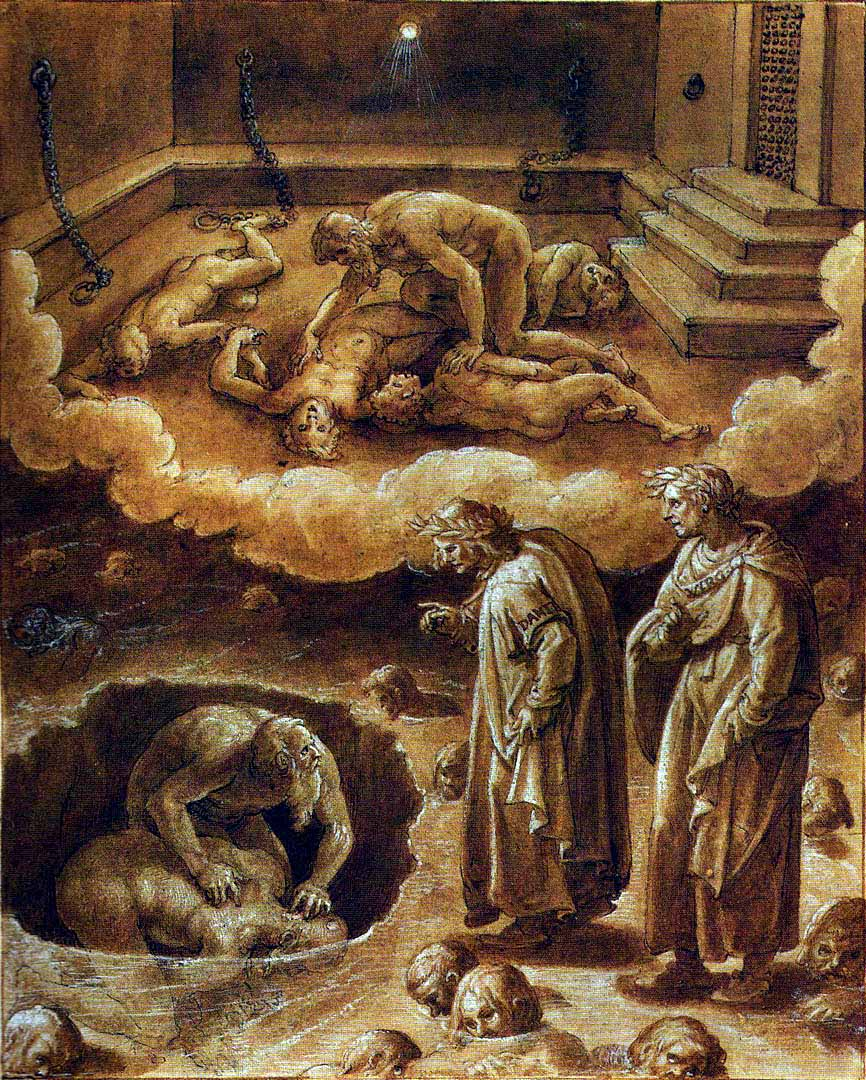
Count Ugolino in Cocytus tells Dante of his death in prison with his descendants (Stradanus)

A flashback, more formally known as analepsis, is an interjected scene that takes the narrative back in time from the current point in the story. Flashbacks are often used to recount events that happened before the story's primary sequence of events to fill in crucial backstory. In the opposite direction, a flashforward (or prolepsis) reveals events that will occur in the future. Both flashback and flashforward are used to cohere a story, develop a character, or add structure to the narrative. In literature, internal analepsis is a flashback to an earlier point in the narrative; external analepsis is a flashback to a time before the narrative started.

In film, flashbacks depict the subjective experience of a character by showing a memory of a previous event and they are often used to "resolve an enigma". Flashbacks are important in film noir and melodrama films. In films and television, several camera techniques, editing approaches and special effects have evolved to alert the viewer that the action shown is a flashback or flashforward; for example, the edges of the picture may be deliberately blurred, photography may be jarring or choppy, or unusual coloration or sepia tone, or monochrome when most of the story is in full color, may be used. The scene may fade or dissolve, often with the camera focused on the face of the character and there is typically a voice-over by a narrator (who is often the character who is experiencing the memory).

The psychological phenomenon has also frequently been portrayed narratively in film and television. Some of the most accurate media portrayals of psychological flashbacks have been those related to wartime, and the association to PTSD caused by the traumas and stresses of war. One of the earliest screen portrayals of this is in the 1945 film Mildred Pierce.

== Notable examples ==
=== Literature ===
An early example of analepsis is in the Ramayana and Mahabharata, where the main story is narrated through a frame story set at a later time. Another early use of this device in a murder mystery was in "The Three Apples", an Arabian Nights tale. The story begins with the discovery of a young woman's dead body. After the murderer later reveals himself, he narrates his reasons for the murder in a series of flashbacks leading up to the discovery of her dead body at the beginning of the story. Flashbacks are also employed in several other Arabian Nights tales, such as "Sinbad the Sailor" and "The City of Brass".

Analepsis was used extensively by author Ford Madox Ford, and by poet, author, historian and mythologist Robert Graves. The 1927 book The Bridge of San Luis Rey by Thornton Wilder is the progenitor of the modern disaster epic in literature and film-making, where a single disaster intertwines the victims, whose lives are then explored by means of flashbacks of events leading up to the disaster. Analepsis is also used in Night by Elie Wiesel. If flashbacks are extensive and in chronological order, one can say that these form the present of the story, while the rest of the story consists of flashforwards. If flashbacks are presented in non-chronological order, the time at which the story takes place can be ambiguous: One such work is Slaughterhouse-Five, in which the narrative jumps back and forth in time, so there is no actual present time line. Os Lusíadas is a story about a voyage of Vasco da Gama to India and back. The narration starts when they were arriving in Africa but it quickly flashes back to the beginning of the story, which is when they were leaving Portugal.

The Harry Potter series employs a magical device called a Pensieve, which changes the nature of flashbacks from a mere narrative device to an event directly experienced by the characters, who are thus able to provide commentary.

=== Film ===
The creator of the flashback technique in cinema was Histoire d'un crime directed by Ferdinand Zecca in 1901. An early flashback in cinema occurs throughout D.W. Griffith's film Hearts of the World (1918): for example, during the wall scene with the Boy at 1:33. Flashbacks were first employed during the sound era in Rouben Mamoulian's 1931 film City Streets, but were rare until about 1939 when, in William Wyler's Wuthering Heights as in Emily Brontë's original novel, the housekeeper Ellen narrates the main story to overnight visitor Mr. Lockwood, who has witnessed Heathcliff's frantic pursuit of what is apparently a ghost. More famously, also in 1939, Marcel Carné's film Le Jour Se Lève is told almost entirely through flashback: the story starts with the murder of a man in a hotel. While the murderer, played by Jean Gabin, is surrounded by the police, several flashbacks tell the story of why he killed the man at the beginning of the film.

One of the most famous flashbacks is in the Orson Welles film Citizen Kane (1941). The protagonist, Charles Foster Kane, dies at the beginning, uttering the word Rosebud. The remainder of the film is framed by a reporter's interviewing Kane's friends and associates, in a futile effort to discover what the word meant to Kane. As the interviews proceed, pieces of Kane's life unfold in flashback, but Welles' use of such unconventional flashbacks was thought to have been influenced by William K. Howard's The Power and the Glory. Lubitsch used a flashback in Heaven Can Wait (1943), which tells the story of Henry Van Cleve. Though usually used to clarify plot or backstory, flashbacks can also act as an unreliable narrator. The multiple and contradictory staged reconstructions of a crime in Errol Morris's 1988 documentary The Thin Blue Line are presented as flashbacks based on divergent testimony. Akira Kurosawa's 1950 Rashomon does this in the most celebrated fictional use of contested multiple testimonies.

Sometimes a flashback is inserted into a film even though there was none in the original source from which the film was adapted. The 1956 film version of Rodgers and Hammerstein's stage musical Carousel used a flashback device which somewhat takes the impact away from a very dramatic plot development later in the film. This was done because the plot of Carousel was then considered unusually strong for a film musical. In the film version of Camelot (1967), according to Alan Jay Lerner, a flashback was added not to soften the blow of a later plot development but because the stage show had been criticized for shifting too abruptly in tone from near-comedy to tragedy.

In Billy Wilder's film noir Double Indemnity (1944), a flashback from the main character is used to provide a confession to his fraudulent and criminal activities. Fish & Cat is the first single-shot movie with several flashbacks.

In John Brahm's film noir The Locket (1946), a unique hat trick (a flashback within a flashback within a flashback) gives psychological depth to the story of a woman who was allegedly a kleptomaniac, inveterate liar, and murderess but had never been punished for any of her crimes.

A good example of both flashback and flashforward is the first scene of La Jetée (1962). As we learn a few minutes later, what we are seeing in that scene is a flashback to the past, since the present of the film's diegesis is a time directly following World War III. However, as we learn at the end of the film, that scene also doubles as a prolepsis, since the dying man the boy is seeing is, in fact, himself. In other words, he is proleptically seeing his own death. We thus have an analepsis and prolepsis in the same scene.

Occasionally, a story may contain a flashback within a flashback, with the earliest known example appearing in Jacques Feyder's L'Atlantide. Little Annie Rooney (1925) contains a flashback scene in a Chinese laundry, with a flashback within that flashback in the corner of the screen. In John Ford's The Man Who Shot Liberty Valance (1962), the main action of the film is told in flashback, with the scene of Liberty Valance's murder occurring as a flashback within that flashback. Other examples that contains flashbacks within flashbacks are the 1968 Japanese film Lone Wolf Isazo and 2004's The Phantom of the Opera, where almost the entire film (set in 1870) is told as a flashback from 1919 (in black-and-white) and contains other flashbacks; for example, Madame Giry rescuing the Phantom from a freak show. An extremely convoluted story may contain flashbacks within flashbacks within flashbacks, as in Six Degrees of Separation, Passage to Marseille, and The Locket.

This technique is a hallmark of Kannada movie director Upendra. He has employed this technique in his movies – Om (1995), A (1998) and the futuristic Super (2010) – set in 2030 containing multiple flashbacks ranging from 2010 to 2015 depicting a Utopian India.

Satyajit Ray experimented with flashbacks in The Adversary (Pratidwandi, 1972), pioneering the technique of photo-negative flashbacks. He also uses flashbacks in other films, such as Nayak (1966), Kapurush- O – Mahapurush (1965), Aranyer Din Ratri (1970), and Jalsaghar (1959). In fact, Nayak is entirely a nonlinear narrative which explores the Hero's (Arindam's) past through seven flashbacks and two dreams. He also uses extensive flashbacks in the Kanchenjunga (1962).

Quentin Tarantino makes extensive use of the flashback and flashforward in many of his films. Reservoir Dogs (1992), for example, intercuts scenes of the present story with various flashbacks that give each character's backstory and motivation. In Pulp Fiction (1994), which uses a highly nonlinear narrative, traditional flashback is also used in the sequence titled "The Gold Watch". Other films, such as his two-part Kill Bill (Part I 2003, Part II 2004), also feature a narrative that bounces between present time and flashbacks.

=== Television ===
The television series Quantico, Kung Fu, Psych, How I Met Your Mother, Grounded for Life, Once Upon a Time, and I Didn't Do It use flashbacks in every episode. Flashbacks were a predominant feature of the television shows Lost, Arrow, Phineas and Ferb, Orange Is the New Black, 13 Reasons Why, Elite and Quicksand. Many detective shows routinely use flashback in the last act to illustrate the detective's reconstruction of the culprit's plot, e.g. Murder, She Wrote, Banacek, Columbo. The television show Leverage uses a flashback at the end of each episode to show how the protagonists successfully carried out their confidence trick on the episode's antagonist.

The anime Inuyasha flashes backs to half a century earlier in the two-part episode "The Tragic Love Song of Destiny" (episodes 147 and 148, in the sixth season), narrated by the elderly younger sister of Lady Kikyo, Lady Kaede.

In Princess Half-Demon, the spinoff to the aforementioned anime, the premiere flashes back eighteen years, to five months since the conclusion of the original series' seventh season. Episode fifteen, "Farewell Under the Lunar Eclipse", is narrated by Riku, who explains what had happened before and right after the Half-Demon Princesses were born; namely where Inuyasha and nineteen-year-old Kagome Higurashi had ended up, trapped within the Black Pearl at the border of the Afterlife for fourteen years. Some months later, there are flashbacks of memories belonging to Jaken ("The Silver-Scale Curse") and Hachimon ("Battle of the Moon, Part 1").

The Disney Channel series Phineas and Ferb has many flashbacks and flashforwards. In several episodes, the main antagonist, Dr. Doofenshmirtz, uses flashbacks to explain his past. A gag in the episode "Doof Dynasty" notes that, when a character explains their past, their body ripples (referencing the "ripple effect" which starts a flashback in other media). The whole episode "Act Your Age" is a flashforward of the characters as teenagers. Several other episodes also feature flashbacks of the main characters' ancestors who, as a running gag, always seem to look like the main characters with slight variations in clothing, but the same mannerisms and voices. (Northern Exposure episode "Cicely" used a similar device, with the main cast playing unrelated characters of 84 years before, at the founding of the village.)

Breaking Bad and its spinoff Better Call Saul frequently employ flashbacks, most often in the form of the cold open. While many of the flashbacks take place years before the events of each series, some are new scenes set during previous episodes, such as Breaking Bad's "Más" and "Ozymandias," whose openings are set during the show's pilot. The final three episodes of Better Call Saul, set in the post-Breaking Bad timeline, also include flashbacks taking place both between and during the two series' time frames.

The 2D hand-drawn animated show Rapunzel's Tangled Adventure (known as Tangled: The Series during its first season) began showing flashbacks set a quarter of a century ago in the Dark Kingdom, where the heavenly Moonstone resides within for hundreds of years in the second season's premiere "Beyond the Walls of Corona", "Rapunzel and the Great Tree" and the finale "Destinies Collide."
