= Waterworks (Better Call Saul) =

- Better Call Saul episode
- Promotional poster
- Episode no.: Season 6 Episode 12
- Directed by: Vince Gilligan
- Written by: Vince Gilligan
- Cinematography by: Paul Donachie
- Editing by: Chris McCaleb; Joey Liew
- Original air date: August 8, 2022
- Running time: 58 minutes

Guest appearances
- Pat Healy as Jeff; Tina Parker as Francesca Liddy; Sandrine Holt as Cheryl Hamlin; Kevin Sussman as Mr. Lingk; Alvin Cowan as Glenn; John Koyama as Emilio Koyama; Carol Burnett as Marion; Aaron Paul as Jesse Pinkman

Episode chronology
← Previous "Breaking Bad"	Next → "Saul Gone"
- Better Call Saul season 6

"Waterworks" is the twelfth and penultimate episode of the sixth season of Better Call Saul, the spin-off television series of Breaking Bad. It was written and directed by co-creator Vince Gilligan. The episode aired on AMC and AMC+ on August 8, 2022, before debuting online in certain territories on Netflix the following day. "Waterworks" primarily takes place after the events of Breaking Bad, exploring Kim Wexler's new life in Florida while continuing the depicting of Gene Takavic's illicit activities in Omaha, Nebraska, in addition to addressing Howard Hamlin's death.

"Waterworks" was met with critical acclaim, particularly for Gilligan's direction, writing, cinematography, production values, which critics opined helped improve the episode's aesthetic, and Rhea Seehorn's performance, highlighting her interactions with Cheryl Hamlin and her emotional breakdown. An estimated 1.32 million viewers saw the episode during its first broadcast on AMC. The episode was chosen by Seehorn to support her nomination for Outstanding Supporting Actress in a Drama Series at the 75th Primetime Emmy Awards.

== Plot ==
In 2004, in Albuquerque, New Mexico, Kim Wexler finalizes her divorce with Jimmy McGill, now permanently going as Saul Goodman. Outside Saul's office, Kim has a conversation with Jesse Pinkman, a friend of Saul's latest client, Emilio Koyama. (Note: Jesse and Emilio's partnership is seen in the pilot episode of Breaking Bad, and the latter's relationship with Saul is referenced in the Breaking Bad episode "Better Call Saul".) Jesse notes Saul's shady advertising and asks whether he is a good lawyer; Kim replies that he was when she knew him.

In 2010, Kim leads a mundane suburban lifestyle in Titusville, Florida, where she has a desk job at Palm Coast Sprinkler. She avoids giving her opinion or otherwise making decisions. While at work, she receives a call (Note: Jimmy's side of the call was shown in the previous episode, "Breaking Bad.") from Jimmy checking in on her; Kim tells him to turn himself in. Jimmy angrily refuses, challenging her to turn herself in for her involvement in Howard Hamlin's death. Kim states she is glad Jimmy is alive and hangs up.

Kim flies to Albuquerque and visits Cheryl, Howard's widow, to whom she gives a written confession detailing her and Jimmy's plot to character-assassinate Howard, as well as the truth about his death. Kim says she submitted the affidavit to the district attorney but notes she might not face prosecution due to the lack of physical evidence or witnesses. That night, she has an emotional breakdown while riding an airport shuttle bus.

In Omaha, Nebraska, Jimmy, in his Gene persona, breaks into the home of Mr. Lingk, the latest target of his identity-theft scheme, and locates his financial records and account passwords while he is unconscious. Gene lingers in the house and steals some of Lingk's wristwatches from his second-floor loft. Lingk suddenly awakens and sits on the loft stairs; Gene prepares to bludgeon Lingk with an urn containing his dog's ashes, but Lingk passes out again. Outside, Jeff panics when a police car idles behind him and crashes his taxi into a parked vehicle; the distraction allows Gene to escape while Jeff is arrested for the robbery.

Jeff calls Gene and asks him to post bail. Gene calls Marion to ask her to accompany him, explaining that Nebraska does not require a bondsman, and that having a family member present would be more compelling to the authorities. Marion, suspicious of Gene's legal knowledge, uses the computer Jeff bought for her to discover that "Gene" is Saul Goodman. When Gene arrives, he attempts to intimidate Marion into silence but does not stop her as she uses her Life Alert button to alert the police, which causes Gene to flee.

== Production ==
"Waterworks" was written and directed by Breaking Bad and Better Call Saul creator Vince Gilligan. This was Gilligan's only solo writing credit for the series, and the first television episode he wrote by himself since "Felina", the series finale for Breaking Bad. Gilligan rejoined the Better Call Saul writers' room in the sixth season, having left early in the third season and ceded showrunning duties to series co-creator Peter Gould.

Rhea Seehorn was absent from the series since "Fun and Games" three episodes prior. The episode answered the long-posed question from fans and critics alike of Kim Wexler's fate and whereabouts after the events of Breaking Bad. Gilligan mentioned that, over the years, several people asked if Kim was deceased. While acknowledging it as a possibility, the writing staff never considered killing Kim. The writing team purposely chose to refrain from including Kim until the last episode, with Gilligan and Gould citing the primary rationale as being for "showmanship". Seehorn interpreted that "a part of her has died" and her overall character as being a "shell of a person". She discussed Kim's character with Gould and Gilligan, noting that while there was "nothing wrong with her life", it would be considered "tragic" as "we know what she could have been, and her potential and what she wanted". In her phone call with Gene, Seehorn interpreted that Kim asked Gene to turn himself in "out of love" as she did not want Gene to continue living his unhealthy lifestyle. She also acknowledged that while Kim understood Gene's request for her to confess her crimes was "defensive, reactive talk", it was also an indirect challenge to her conscience, which Seehorn believes encouraged her to "take on her own conscience". Gilligan also agreed with her sentiments, further observing changes in her physical appearance and her trauma regarding Howard's death.

The flashback scene in which Kim signed the divorce papers in Saul Goodman's office was described as being "terrible" by Gilligan. He stated that Saul was pretending not to be hurt through a "blasé" demeanor, while Kim was more candid with her emotions. To emphasize the pain of the moment, Gilligan opted to make the scene longer and contain minimal dialogue so that the audience could understand that it was "pathetic and meant to be". Following the scene with Cheryl, Kim then travelled on an airport shuttle bus, in which she experiences an emotional breakdown due to her pain of what she went through; Gilligan posited that it was a "long time coming" while noting her difficult circumstances prior. The title "Waterworks" alludes to either her emotional breakdown or the presence of Saul Goodman in her life again, with Gilligan favoring the latter interpretation.

Scenes of Kim's house in Titusville, Florida, were filmed in Albuquerque, New Mexico, and digital matte paintings used to give the illusion of a tropical environment. Other scenes of Kim driving through Florida and Jimmy driving through Omaha were shot on a soundstage in non-moving vehicles. The scenes set in Omaha are predominantly black-and-white, except for when a Saul Goodman commercial in color reflects on Gene's glasses. Kim's emotional breakdown was filmed on an actual rental-car bus that circled Albuquerque International Sunport, in a full take. Using four cameras for proper camera coverage on Seehorn, the scene was filmed in two takes. Gilligan's wife, Holly Rice, has a cameo as the bus rider who sits next to Kim and puts her hand on her to comfort her.

Aaron Paul again reprised his Breaking Bad role of Jesse Pinkman after appearing in "Breaking Bad". His scene, shot months before the episode to accommodate his schedule during either February or March 2021, was filmed in dark lighting to help conceal his age. Gilligan stated the writers room expressed excitement to have Jesse share a scene with Kim and "have these two worlds collide," while acknowledging that the scene did not substantially develop the plot further.

== Reception ==
=== Critical response ===
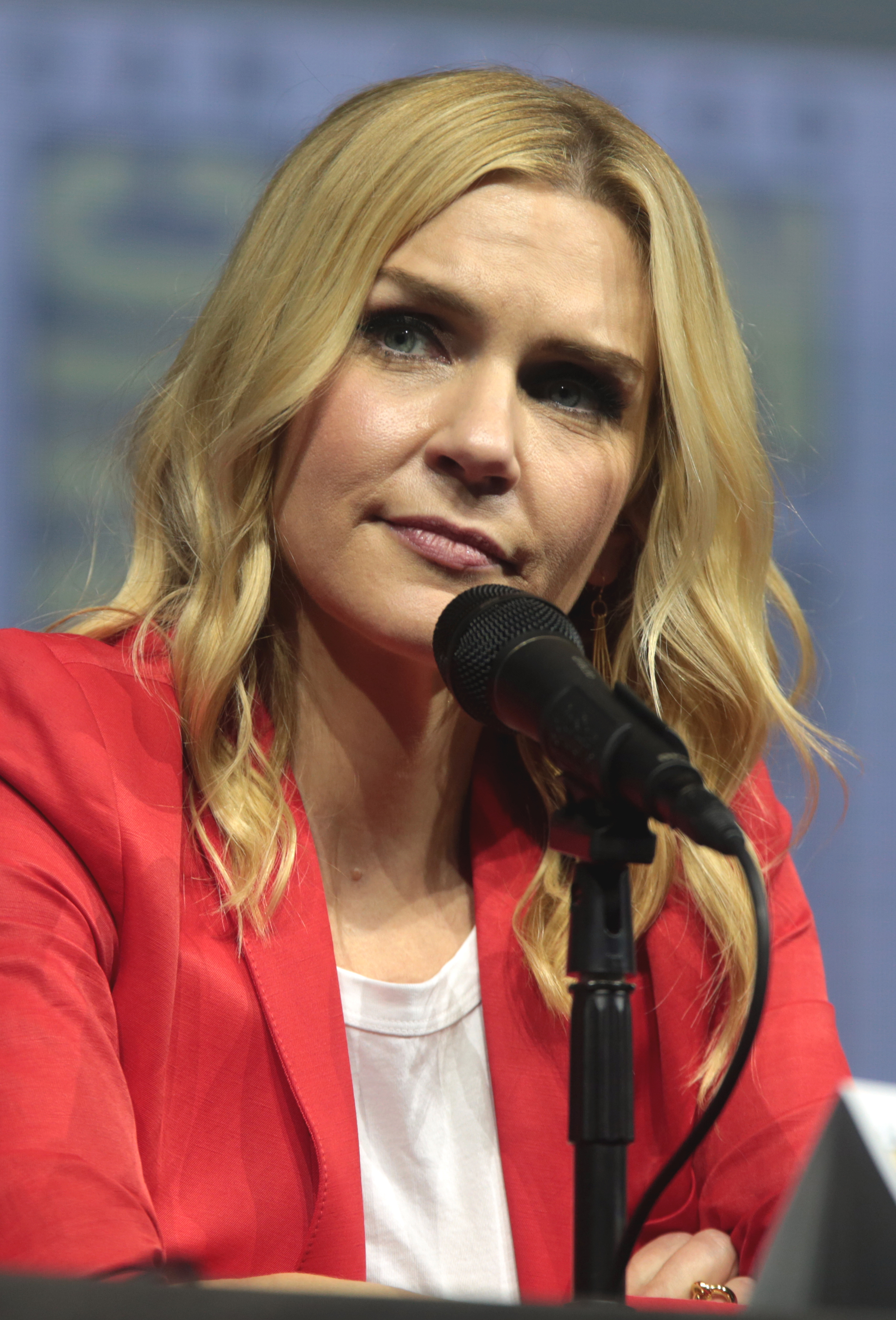
Rhea Seehorn received critical acclaim for her performance in the episode, and earned an Emmy nomination for Outstanding Supporting Actress in a Drama Series.

"Waterworks" received critical acclaim. On the review aggregator Rotten Tomatoes, the episode received an approval rating of 100% based on 11 reviews, with an average rating of 9.5/10. The critical consensus said, "An arresting showcase for Rhea Seehorn, the penultimate installment of Better Call Saul wistfully surveys what came before while teeing up this saga's conclusion with agonizing tension." It received five out of five stars from Scott Tobias of Vulture and Nick Harley of Den of Geek. The A.V. Club's Kimberly Potts and IndieWire's Steve Greene graded the episode with an "A" and "A-" respectively. Harley called the episode "among the very best Vince Gilligan-verse hours assembled", opining the musical score and black-and-white footage contributed to what he deemed a "paranoid noir vibe". He felt the scene with Kim and Jesse Pinkman was superior to that of "Breaking Bad" and felt her dialogue in the scene encapsulated Jimmy McGill's character arc in the show. Liz Shannon Miller of Consequence said the episode was a "masterclass in making the mundane seem both important and suspenseful." IndieWire, Collider, and Rolling Stone praised Seehorn's performance, highlighting Kim's emotional breakdown on the bus. Critics also praised Gilligan's directing and writing, cinematography, and Kim's interactions with Cheryl and Jesse.

Harley called the performance "transcendent" and Chase Hutchinson of Collider said that "her physical performance is nothing short of revelatory", feeling that the integrity of Kim's character had differed from the conduct of the other characters in the show. Greene particularly commented on the scene in which Kim attempts to make amends with Cheryl. He felt that Seehorn's and Sandrine Holt's performances proved that Kim's affidavit was truthful, and cited the work of production designer Denise Pizzini and cinematographer Paul Donachie for conveying Kim's emotions, and called her bus breakdown "something as devastating as anything that Season 6 has unleashed so far". Alan Sepinwall of Rolling Stone labeled it as "the best scene Seehorn has ever played on this show", remarking that Kim had usually controlled her emotions, but her "mask of composure cracks ever so slightly" until she sobs. Vanity Fair's Mike Hogan described it as "a sequence that brilliantly shows off the acting prowess of Rhea Seehorn, who has been spectacular throughout this series". However, David Segal of The New York Times opined that Jesse's appearance was stunt casting as his scene did not contribute to the story meaningfully and critiqued the plausibility of Jeff's car crash.

TVLine named Burnett as an honorable mention for "Performer of the Week", for the week of August 13, 2022. TV Guide ranked "Waterworks" the fifth best episode of the year. Meanwhile, A.A. Dowd from The Ringer ranked the episode as the ninth best episodes in the series, noting the dark tone of the episode.

=== Ratings ===
An estimated 1.32 million viewers watched "Waterworks" during its first broadcast on AMC on August 8, 2022.
