= Uno (Better Call Saul) =

- Better Call Saul episode
- Jimmy McGill argues with parking attendant Mike Ehrmantraut. The actors who play them, Bob Odenkirk and Jonathan Banks, reprise their roles from Breaking Bad.
- Episode no.: Season 1 Episode 1
- Directed by: Vince Gilligan
- Written by: Vince Gilligan; Peter Gould
- Cinematography by: Arthur Albert
- Editing by: Skip Macdonald
- Original air date: February 8, 2015
- Running time: 53 minutes

Guest appearances
- Julie Ann Emery as Betsy Kettleman; Jeremy Shamos as Craig Kettleman; Míriam Colón as Abuelita Salamanca; Eileen Fogarty as Mrs. Nguyen; Steven Levine as Lars Lindholm; Daniel Spenser Levine as Cal Lindholm; Raymond Cruz as Tuco Salamanca

Episode chronology
← Previous —	Next → "Mijo"
- Better Call Saul season 1

"Uno" is the series premiere of the television series Better Call Saul, the spinoff series of Breaking Bad. The episode was written by series creators Vince Gilligan and Peter Gould, and directed by Gilligan. In the United States, the episode aired on February 8, 2015 and lasted 50 minutes and 55 seconds, on AMC. Outside of the United States, the episode premiered on streaming service Netflix in several countries.

The series mainly takes place in 2002, approximately six years prior to the title character Saul Goodman (Bob Odenkirk) meeting Walter White (Bryan Cranston). In "Uno", Jimmy McGill (Saul), is a struggling lawyer living in and working out of a makeshift office at the back of a nail salon. Jonathan Banks reprises his role as Mike Ehrmantraut, a retired cop working as a parking lot security guard, as does Raymond Cruz as Tuco Salamanca, a high-ranking Mexican drug dealer. The episode received generally positive reviews from critics, and at the time, it became the most-watched series premiere for a scripted series in U.S. cable history, with 6.9 million viewers.

== Plot ==
=== Opening ===
In Omaha, Nebraska, a balding, mustached Saul Goodman, now living under the pseudonym "Gene Takavic", works as the manager of a shopping mall Cinnabon, wary of being recognized. In his apartment that night, he tearfully watches a VHS tape of his old television commercials.

=== Main story ===
In May 2002, Jimmy McGill is a struggling Albuquerque attorney. After representing three teenagers as a public defender, he is frustrated to be paid only $700. On his way out of the courthouse parking lot to meet a prospective client, Jimmy is stopped by attendant Mike Ehrmantraut; Mike refuses to let him exit until he pays cash or provides a court-supplied parking sticker.

Jimmy meets with Betsy and Craig Kettleman, who are being investigated for embezzlement. They are hesitant to hire him and when Jimmy later tries to order them flowers while driving, he hits a man on a skateboard. The skateboarder's twin brother videotapes the incident and threatens to call the police unless Jimmy pays them. Recognizing their ruse, Jimmy refuses. Afterward, he returns to his "office" – the boiler room of a Vietnamese beauty salon – where he finds a check from Hamlin, Hamlin & McGill (HHM). Jimmy tears up the check and later accuses the partners of offering a token payment to cheat his brother Chuck McGill out of his partnership. On his way out of HHM, he sees the Kettlemans entering, which causes him to angrily and repeatedly kick a trash can.

Jimmy visits Chuck, who is housebound and believes he has electromagnetic hypersensitivity. He has no electricity and works by lantern light on a manual typewriter. Chuck refuses to accept a buyout from HHM and also suggests that Jimmy stop using the McGill name for his law practice.

Jimmy tracks down the skateboarders, Cal and Lars, and tells them he got the nickname "Slippin' Jimmy" as a young man by faking "slip and fall" accidents for easy money. He arranges for one of them to be struck by Betsy's car, which will enable him to make another pitch to defend the Kettlemans. However, after the accident, the motorist drives off without checking on Cal. The twins give chase, but when the car stops, an elderly woman exits. They try to make her pay and follow her into her house. Jimmy arrives moments later and begins to search, but is pulled into the house at gunpoint by Tuco Salamanca.

== Production ==
=== Development ===
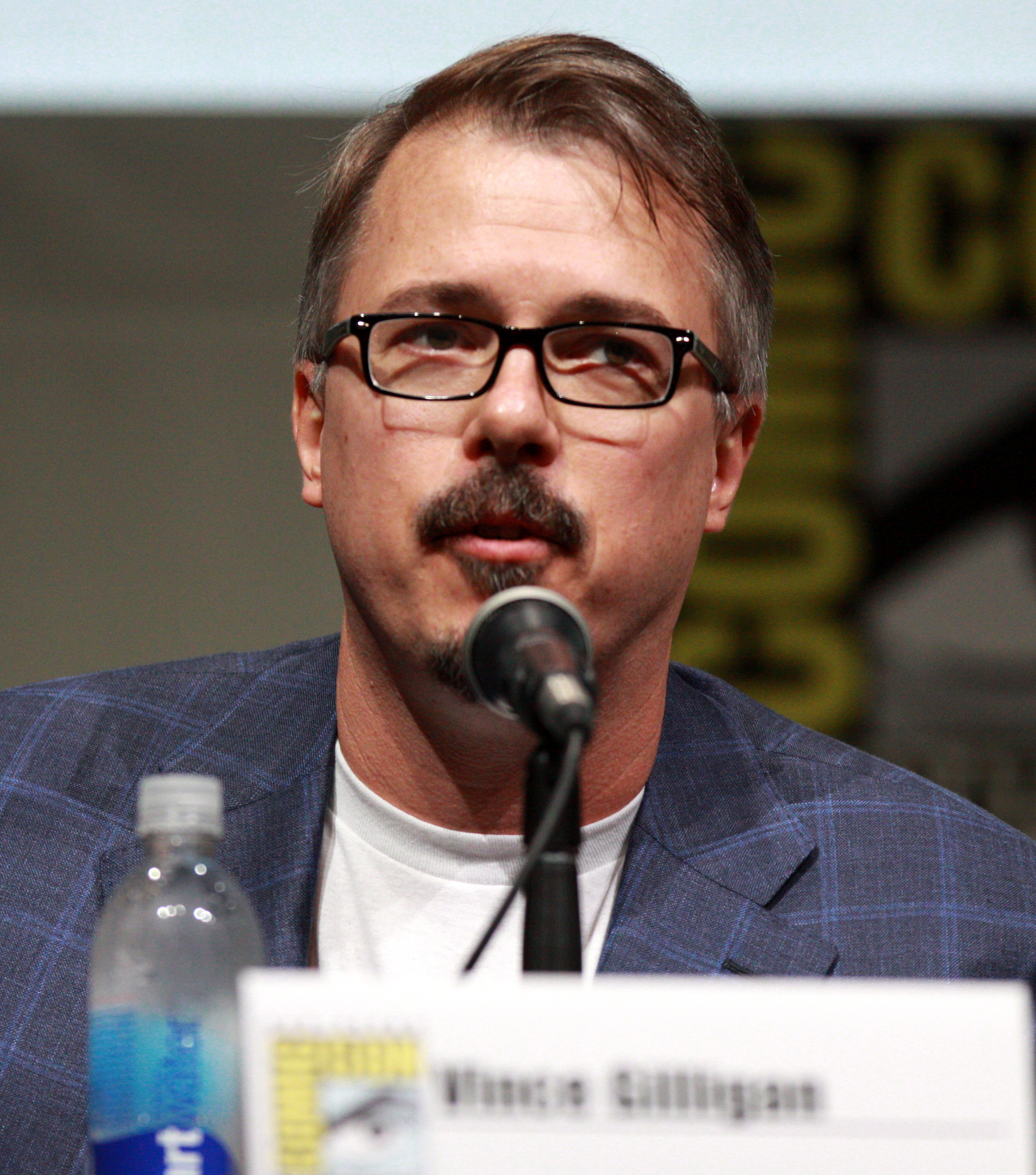
Series co-creator Vince Gilligan, who also created predecessor Breaking Bad

A spin-off series to Breaking Bad was first discussed during the airing of the show's fifth season. In July 2012, Breaking Bad creator Vince Gilligan hinted at a possible spin-off series focusing on Goodman. In April 2013, the series was confirmed to be in development by Gilligan and Gould; the latter wrote the Breaking Bad episode that introduced the character. In a July 2012 interview, Gilligan said he liked "the idea of a lawyer show in which the main lawyer will do anything it takes to stay out of a court of law" including settling on the courthouse steps.

=== Filming ===
The show is filmed in Albuquerque, New Mexico, where Breaking Bad was also shot. As filming began on June 2, 2014, concerns were expressed regarding the possible disappointment from the series' turnout, in terms of audience reception. On June 19, 2014, AMC announced it had renewed the series for a second season of 13 episodes to premiere in early 2016, with the first season to consist of 10 episodes, and that the series premiere had been delayed to early 2015. The first teaser trailer debuted on AMC on August 10, 2014, and confirmed its premiere date of February 2015.

In the cold open, Saul (now hiding his real identity under the alias Gene), is working at a shopping mall Cinnabon. This scene is set in Omaha, Nebraska, but it was filmed in Albuquerque, New Mexico, at the Cottonwood Mall. The cold open is predominantly shown in black and white, except for a brief moment where a Saul Goodman commercial in color reflects on Gene's glasses.

== Cultural references ==
As Jimmy barges into a partner's meeting at HHM, he shouts "You have meddled with the primal forces of nature, Mr. Hamlin, and I won't have it!", paraphrasing a quote from the film Network. As Jimmy exits HHM's offices after arguing with the partners, he shouts "You Will Atone!" When no one understands the reference, he says "It's Ned Beatty from Network. For Christ's sake, guys."

== Reception ==
=== Critical response ===
On the review aggregator website Rotten Tomatoes, 100% of 20 critics' reviews are positive, with an average rating of 8.70/10. The website's consensus reads: "The premiere will be familiar territory, but Bob Odenkirk's turn as Jimmy McGill establishes Better Call Saul as a worthy character study in its own right."

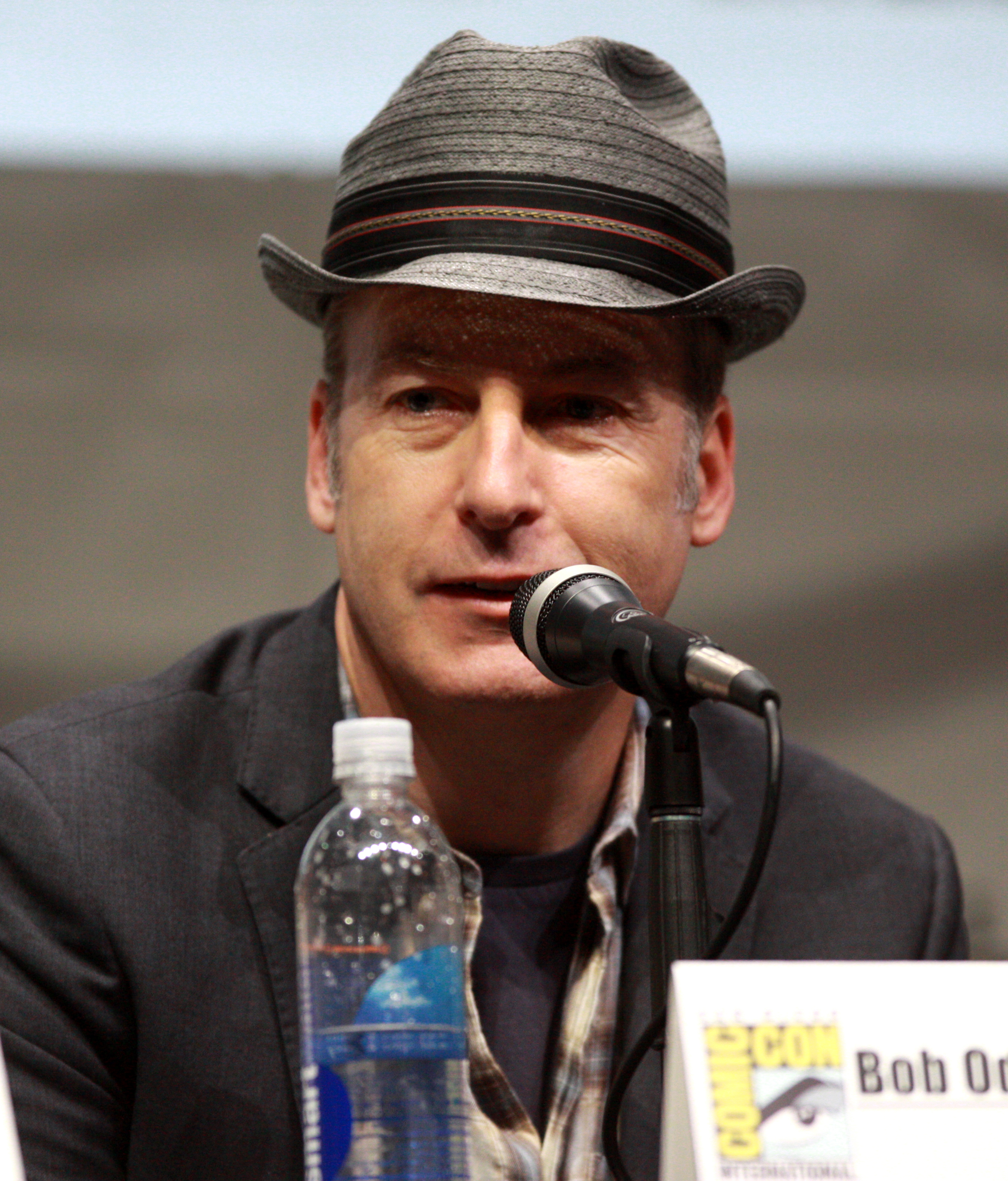
Bob Odenkirk received universal acclaim for his performance in "Uno".

Erik Kain of Forbes said of the episode and series: "[It] isn't just a spin-off of a popular TV show. So far, it's a terrific TV show on its own merits. It covers familiar ground, but it still manages to be its own unique snowflake." Hank Stuever of The Washington Post graded it a "B+" and wrote the series "is right in line with the tone and style of the original, now-classic series" and that it "raises more questions in two hours than it will readily answer". Stephen Marche of Esquire wrote that the first few episodes were better than Breaking Bad. Kirsten Acuna of Business Insider declared the initial episodes "everything you could possibly want from a spinoff television series".

Roth Cornet of IGN gave the episode an 8.7 out of 10, saying, "Can Saul compete with Walter White? No. But he doesn't have to. Better Call Saul poses one simple, but fascinating question: What happened to Jimmy McGill that forced him to transform himself into the ruthless, hardened, yet entirely entertaining *criminal* lawyer Saul Goodman? The man that we came to know and love on Breaking Bad. I, for one, look forward to watching that story unfold." Michael Star of The New York Post wrote, "Sunday's premiere episode moves along at a brisk clip, with moody cinematography that, like Breaking Bad, somehow makes the bright New Mexico sunlight, set against a brilliant azure sky, seem like stormy foreboding—lifted by Odenkirk's confident performance and Jimmy's snappy dialogue .... I'm always interested to see how/if a new show carries its premiere momentum forward, especially with a show like Better Call Saul, which was hyped so relentlessly by AMC that you began to wonder."

Robert Bianco of USA Today said, "Face it: When AMC announced it had ordered a prequel to Breaking Bad, odds are many of us saw it as a callow move by a network bereft of new ideas to milk an old one for all it was worth. Well, we were right—but what we failed to factor in were the gifts star Bob Odenkirk and creators Vince Gilligan and Peter Gould would bring to Better Call Saul ... and their ability to transform what looked to be a sow's ear into something pretty much approaching a silk purse." In her review, Mary McNamara of The Los Angeles Times summarized that "the beauty of Saul was his unflappable nature; no matter how dire or dreadful the circumstances, he was able to identify the next logical step and take it. Jimmy McGill doesn't know how to do that yet; Better Call Saul will show us how he learned."

=== Ratings and accolades ===
Upon airing, the episode became the highest-rated series premiere for a scripted series in U.S. cable history up to that date, with 6.9 million viewers. The show placed second for the night among U.S. cable networks, behind only its lead-in show The Walking Dead, which as of February 9, 2015, ranks as the second-highest rated entertainment broadcast with adults 18–49 in the U.S., behind The Blacklist episode "Luther Braxton" which aired after Super Bowl XLIX.

Vince Gilligan and Peter Gould won the Writers Guild of America Award for Television: Episodic Drama for this episode. At the American Cinema Editors Awards, editor Skip Macdonald received a nomination for Best Edited One-Hour Series for Commercial Television.
