= Breaking Bad (Better Call Saul) =

- Better Call Saul episode
- Promotional poster
- Episode no.: Season 6 Episode 11
- Directed by: Thomas Schnauz
- Written by: Thomas Schnauz
- Cinematography by: Marshall Adams
- Editing by: Skip Macdonald
- Original air date: August 1, 2022
- Running time: 57 minutes

Guest appearances
- Pat Healy as Jeff; Tina Parker as Francesca Liddy; Kevin Sussman as Mr. Lingk; Devin Ratray as Alfred Hawthorne Hill; Max Bickelhaup as Buddy; Carol Burnett as Marion; Bryan Cranston as Walter White; Aaron Paul as Jesse Pinkman

Episode chronology
← Previous "Nippy"	Next → "Waterworks"
- Better Call Saul season 6

"Breaking Bad" is the eleventh episode of the sixth season of Better Call Saul, the spin-off television series of Breaking Bad. It was written and directed by Thomas Schnauz. The episode aired on AMC and AMC+ on August 1, 2022, before debuting online in certain territories on Netflix the following day. "Breaking Bad" depicts the life of Jimmy McGill (Bob Odenkirk), both during his time as lawyer "Saul Goodman" in Albuquerque, New Mexico, and after changing his identity to Gene Takavic and relocating to Omaha, Nebraska.

The episode was met with positive reviews, with particular focus on the appearances of Walter White (Bryan Cranston) and Jesse Pinkman (Aaron Paul), the performances of Cranston, Paul, and Odenkirk, connections to Breaking Bad, and the regression of Jimmy McGill's character into a more ruthless version of Saul Goodman. An estimated 1.34 million viewers saw the episode during its first broadcast on AMC.

== Plot ==
In flashbacks to Albuquerque in 2008, (Note: During the events of the Breaking Bad episode "Better Call Saul".) Jimmy McGill, going by the name Saul Goodman, has been kidnapped by Walter White and Jesse Pinkman and is being transported in the back of their RV. After Saul recognizes their real motive, he returns to the RV and sees their methamphetamine lab. He correctly identifies Walter as "Heisenberg", who is known for producing high-quality blue meth. He agrees to take Walter and Jesse on as clients. Later, Mike Ehrmantraut visits Saul and provides him with information about Walter, including the fact that he has cancer. Mike advises Saul against working with Walter, calling him an amateur, but Saul is impressed by the quality of his meth. Afterwards, Saul arrives at the school where Walter works to convince him to let Saul be his full-time counsel.

On November 12, 2010, Francesca Liddy drives to a pay phone in a remote location (Note: The pay phone is outside a gas station that has gone out of business. This is the same station where Jesse was short of cash and paid for gasoline with meth in the Breaking Bad episode "Green Light".) and awaits a call from Jimmy, (Note: As was arranged in "Quite a Ride".) now living as Gene Takavic in Omaha. Francesca answers and updates Gene on events that have happened since he left Albuquerque. She tells Gene that the police seized all his assets and that she received a call from his ex-wife Kim Wexler, who asked about his safety. Gene is taken aback and later calls Kim's workplace in Florida. However, the conversation turns argumentative, (Note: Kim's side of the call is revealed in "Waterworks".) and an enraged Gene hangs up.

Despite having previously warned them to avoid all contact with him, (Note: As seen in "Nippy".) Gene convinces Jeff and Buddy to help him with another scam in which Gene targets rich single men at bars and buys them drinks. Jeff then picks them up in his taxi and offers them bottles of water laced with barbiturates. Once the target is home and unconscious, Buddy enters and photographs his personal and financial information, including credit cards, driver's licenses, and tax documents, which the group sells for use in identity theft schemes. One night, Gene targets Mr. Lingk, a man who has cancer. Despite feeling guilty, Gene continues with the usual plan. Buddy expresses misgivings; unknown to the group, Marion witnesses Gene angrily escorting Buddy into her garage as he unsuccessfully tries to persuade Buddy to do his part. Gene fires Buddy, enlists a reluctant Jeff to help him finish stealing Lingk's information, and breaks into Lingk's house himself.

== Production ==
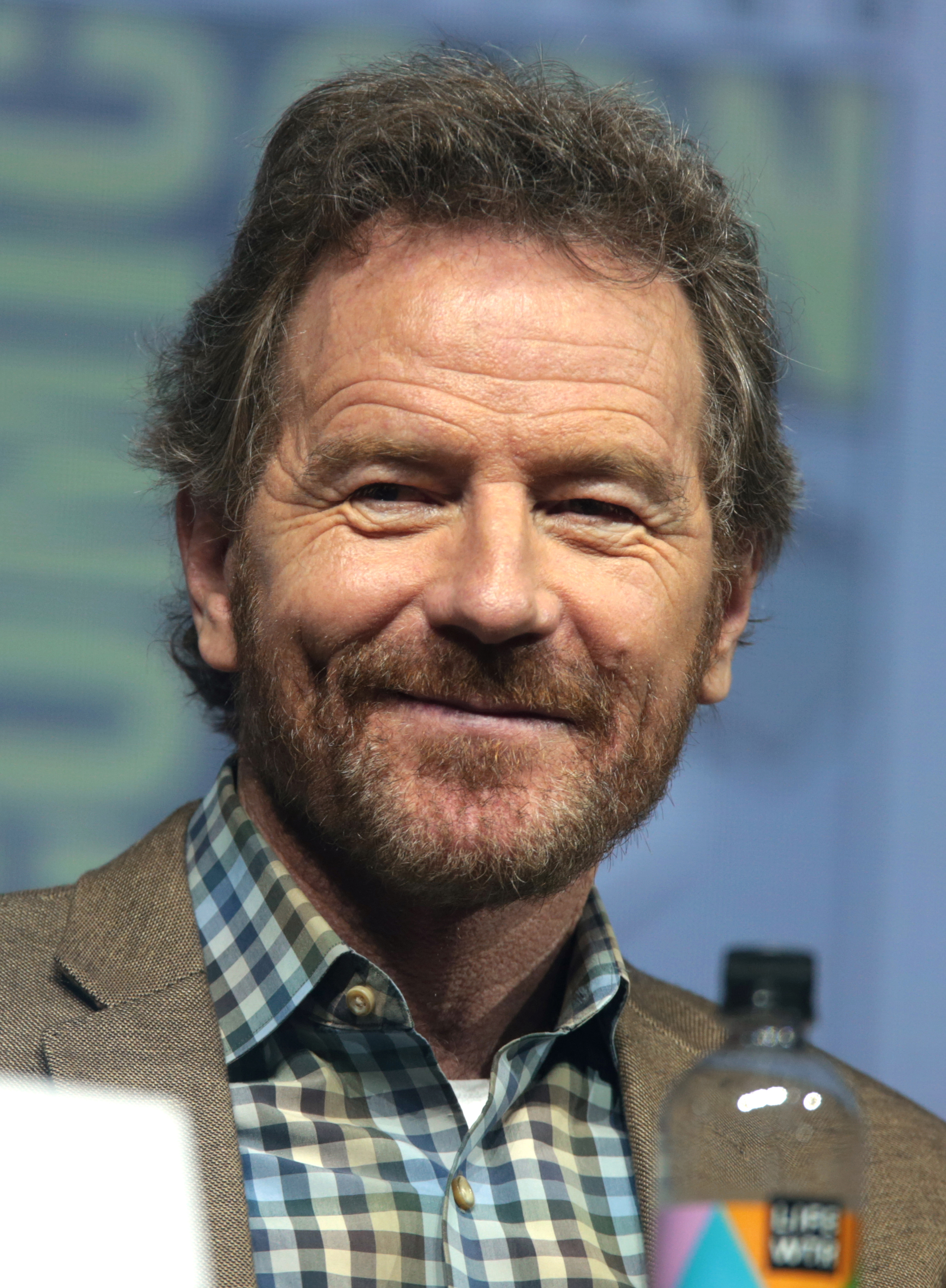
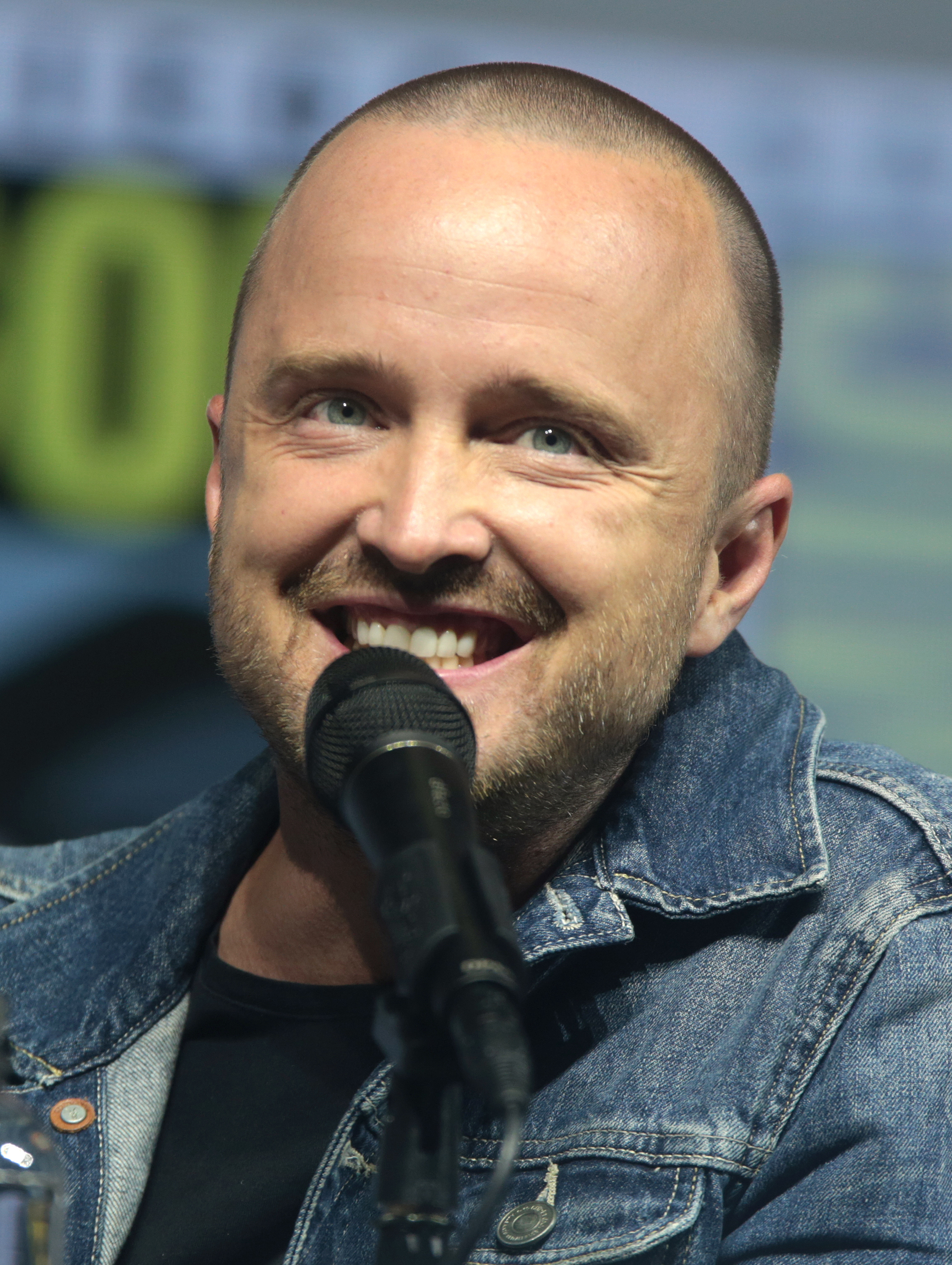
"Breaking Bad" marks the return of Bryan Cranston and Aaron Paul as meth cooks Walter White and Jesse Pinkman, the leads of Breaking Bad.

The episode shares its title with Breaking Bad, the show that precedes Better Call Saul – mirroring the Breaking Bad episode which introduced Saul being named "Better Call Saul". "Breaking Bad" was written and directed by Thomas Schnauz, who worked with the writing staff since the third season of Breaking Bad. Schnauz wanted to extend the phone call scene with Jimmy and Francesca and chose to include Jimmy contacting Kim. However, he did not want to reveal the dialogue of Jimmy's call with Kim until later, as he felt that it was "better to get right to the emotion of what happened during that phone call and how that emotion spiraled" into subsequent events, due to the length of the scene. The dialogue was deliberately suppressed by noise coming from traffic. He further described Gene as a "whole other creature entirely", being neither Saul nor Jimmy; Saul did not process his trauma in a healthy manner and instead kept ignoring his trauma, with Schnauz saying "the more he pushes it down, the more it wants to rise up like a volcano, and he needs to do even worse stuff". He also noted the parallel between Saul accepting Walter and Jesse as clients and Gene performing scams with Jeff and Buddy, as he is dealing with Wexler's separation. He included Mike Nesmith's original demo for The Monkees song "Tapioca Tundra" (1968), as he felt a lyric from that song symbolized McGill's identity crisis. The phone call catalyzed Jimmy McGill to regress into his Saul Goodman persona and subsequently plan his illicit scams in Omaha, with Schnauz describing the action as Jimmy's "drug of choice to numb that pain". During one of his scams, Jimmy makes the decision to perform identity theft on Mr. Lingk, a cancer patient. Schnauz said that due to this action, redemption for Jimmy would be difficult, as it was an escalation from his previous actions. D. W. Griffith's film Intolerance (1916) inspired how the different timelines were depicted and intercut.

Bob Odenkirk and Jonathan Banks, who play Jimmy McGill and Mike Ehrmantraut, are the only cast members listed in the starring credits. The audio team reused an audio snippet from the original Breaking Bad "Better Call Saul" episode where Goodman was gagged and altered it to convey it from his point of view. Cinematographer Marshall Adams sought to replicate Michael Slovis's work on Breaking Bad, particularly through emulating Slovis's lighting and coloring techniques. He decided to include Walter White and Jesse Pinkman in the episode as he felt "[it came down to] highlighting the emotions", and compared Saul "needing to up his game" to Walter's behavior. While intersecting the storylines of Breaking Bad into Better Call Saul, the showrunners coined the phrase "dancing through the raindrops", which described the mix of Jimmy's present world with his future as Saul Goodman. Schnauz wanted to continue "dancing through the raindrops" as the series progressed further and felt that it culminated in the episode, while also affirming that the episode began the "morph into a nebulous third thing that goes beyond both Breaking Bad and Better Call Saul". He always intended to connect the two series together but did not find the right opportunity to do so until he decided to connect it to its mirror scene in the Breaking Bad episode "Better Call Saul" and having Saul reference Nacho Varga when he shouts "It wasn't me, it was Ignacio".

"Breaking Bad" features the return of Bryan Cranston and Aaron Paul as Walter White and Jesse Pinkman, the main characters of Breaking Bad. Discussions for the characters' inclusion occurred since the first season. Their scene in "Breaking Bad" was the first of three scenes that they shot for Better Call Saul. Showrunner Peter Gould was satisfied with the timing of their inclusion and said that it helped subvert fan expectations, desiring to contextualize their appearance through the show's existing story which focused on Jimmy, Kim, and Mike. Gilligan reiterated similar claims, while also adding that the writers wanted to include the characters in the story in an organic manner rather than as fan service. It was filmed in April 2021, during the production of "Carrot and Stick", to accommodate their schedules, which was seven months prior to when Schnauz would actually direct the episode. Schnauz felt that both Cranston and Paul reprised their roles well and said he had to remind Cranston that his performance should align with Walt's character in the second season of Breaking Bad rather than the fifth. Despite the fact that Better Call Saul didn't employ de-aging technology for most flashback scenes, Schnauz opted to apply moderate de-aging on Cranston's and Paul's faces to erase some lines. Filming of the scene was difficult due to the actors' complicated schedules and Paul's facial hair for an upcoming project. As such, Schnauz wrote the scene towards the beginning of the writing for the sixth season. It occurred prior to Odenkirk's heart attack on the production of "Carrot and Stick". Though both RV vehicles used during filming of Breaking Bad were still available, the one normally used for interior shots was gutted, so the interior of the RV was recreated on a set. Set designer Ashley Marsh and her team worked from photos and stills from Breaking Bad to reacquire most of the equipment shown in the RV to detail and even worked with the operator of an Albuquerque Breaking Bad tour to provide some of the RV curtains and fabrics. Schnauz wrote their scene before finishing the rest of the episode's script. Filming for the scene took a day and a half. Cranston and Paul's appearances were treated with high secrecy, with both actors kept out of sight while in Albuquerque, similar to Cranston's cameo in El Camino: A Breaking Bad Movie (2019). They stayed in Albuquerque for four days at an Airbnb, with all wardrobe and makeup done in the home and only leaving to be taken on site to shoot. The scenes set in Omaha are entirely in black and white. Sound mixing for "Breaking Bad" was completed by that July.

== Reception ==
=== Critical response ===
"Breaking Bad" received praise from critics. It received 4 out of 5 stars from both Vulture's Scott Tobias and Den of Geek's Nick Harley. Additionally, Kimberly Potts from The A.V. Club gave the episode an "A" grade, while Steve Greene of IndieWire graded it "A–". On the review aggregator Rotten Tomatoes, 100% of nine reviews are positive, with an average rating of 8.4/10.

The payphone call that takes place between Gene and Kim interested many critics, who speculated on what could have occurred and the implications it would have for the show's narrative. Tobias compared the scene to that of Travis Bickle's final call to Cybill Shepherd in Taxi Driver (1976). Mike Hogan, writing for Vanity Fair, speculated that either Kim was not available during the time or that she rejected Gene's attempts for reconciliation. David Segal of The New York Times interpreted the scene as being indicative that the Gene-Kim relationship would be the show's primary focus and was skeptical of a potential reunion as Gene was engaging in more illicit and immoral activities. Alan Sepinwall at Rolling Stone additionally asserted that Gene saw this as a potential opportunity to reach out to Kim, while she primarily saw it as an opportunity for closure.

Continuing his review, Sepinwall primarily focused on its connections to Breaking Bad, feeling satisfied with the interactions between Walter White, Jesse Pinkman, and Gene. He especially praised Cranston and Paul's chemistry. Despite its overt connections and references to Breaking Bad, Sepinwall opined that "it’s much less interested in presenting an alternate history of the Heisenberg era than in drawing parallels between the man Jimmy McGill had become by that point in his life and the man that Gene Takovic [sic] is rapidly slipping back into being [Saul Goodman]". He felt the episode effectively transitioned between its current storyline and the Breaking Bad-era, highlighting the transition during the scene in which the grave that Walt and Jesse dug to intimidate Saul is shown then segues into Gene lying on the bed. Most critics enjoyed the presence of Walter White and Jesse Pinkman, with Greene in particular lauding Schnauz's writing and how the scenes provided additional context making "the two series to be fully symbiotic, like a TV transcontinental railroad working from both coasts and meeting in the middle".

Critics have also extensively noted the unhinged and unsympathetic characterization of Gene Takavic, with Tobias writing that he was "freed from the moral and ethical baggage of being a McGill" and resembled what Chuck McGill previously referred to him as a "chimp with a machine gun". Continuing with his commentary, he concluded that the FBI's confiscation of Jimmy's spare cash spurred him to commit crimes similar to how Walt's cancer diagnosis inspired him to become a criminal. He noted that while Jimmy acted outside of the justice system for people who were wronged, it would eventually corrupt him in the long-term and cause him to "break [bad] all the way". Harley was more interested in Jimmy's character arc rather than the cameos of Walt and Jesse, which did not satisfy him, and enjoyed how the episode explored the themes of addiction, citing Jimmy's addiction to conducting illicit activities for money. Noting the parallel between the two timelines, he also observed that people warned Jimmy to use his judgement and rectify his mistakes and paralleled his predicament to that of Icarus. Potts also observed his lack of empathy when targetting Mr. Lingk during his identity theft scams and highlighted Tina Parker's performance alongside Francesca's role in the episode.

=== Ratings ===
An estimated 1.34 million viewers watched "Breaking Bad" during its first broadcast on AMC on August 1, 2022.
