= Saul Goodman =

Fictional character in the Breaking Bad franchise

- Breaking Bad character
- Bob Odenkirk as Saul Goodman/Jimmy McGill in a promotional poster for Better Call Saul's third season.
- First appearance: "Better Call Saul"; Breaking Bad; April 26, 2009
- Last appearance: "Saul Gone"; Better Call Saul; August 15, 2022
- Created by: Vince Gilligan; Peter Gould
- Portrayed by: Bob Odenkirk; Blake Bertrand (teenage flashback); Cole Whitaker (childhood flashback)
- Voiced by: Sean Giambrone (Slippin' Jimmy)

In-universe information
- Full name: James Morgan McGill
- Aliases: Gene Takavic; Viktor St. Claire
- Nicknames: Slippin' Jimmy; Charlie Hustle (by Howard)
- Gender: Male
- Occupation: Attorney; (criminal defense, elder law); Advisor in Walter White's drug empire; Cell phone store manager; Con artist; Cinnabon manager
- Family: Charles McGill Sr. (father); Ruth McGill (mother); Chuck McGill (brother); Rebecca Bois (former sister-in-law)
- Spouses: Kim Wexler (divorced); Two other spouses (both divorced)
- Home: Cicero, Illinois, United States (before Better Call Saul); Albuquerque, New Mexico, United States; Omaha, Nebraska, United States; Montrose, Colorado, United States (imprisoned)
- Nationality: American
- Ethnicity: Irish
- Date of birth: November 12, 1960
- Birthplace: Cicero, Illinois, United States
- Alma mater: Unidentified institution(s), including final coursework at unspecified Albuquerque community college (undergraduate degree); University of American Samoa (fictional; JD)

James Morgan McGill, better known by his alias Saul Goodman, is a fictional character created by Vince Gilligan and Peter Gould and portrayed by Bob Odenkirk in the Breaking Bad television franchise. He appears as a major character in Breaking Bad (2009–2013) and as the titular protagonist of its spin-offs Better Call Saul (2015–2022) and Slippin’ Jimmy (2022).

Saul is an unscrupulous Albuquerque-based lawyer and con artist who becomes involved in the city's criminal underworld. In Breaking Bad, he acts as the consigliere for methamphetamine cooks Walter White and Jesse Pinkman and plays a crucial role in the development of their drug empire. Better Call Saul's main storyline depicts Saul's origins as the aspiring lawyer Jimmy McGill and his moral deterioration in the six years before the events of Breaking Bad; it also features a post-Breaking Bad storyline, where Saul is living under the assumed name Gene Takavic (/ˈtækəvɪk/ TAK-ə-vik) that explores the consequences of his actions in the franchise.

Saul first appeared in "Better Call Saul" (2009), the eighth episode of Breaking Bad's second season. He was created to provide Walt and Jesse with a guide for their criminal activities and to replace Hank Schrader as Breaking Bad's comic relief. His name, "Saul Goodman", is a play on the phrase "it's all good, man". Although Odenkirk was initially cast for only four episodes as a guest actor, he became integral to the Breaking Bad narrative after Gilligan and Gould were impressed by his performance; Odenkirk subsequently joined the main cast in the third season and remained through to the fifth and final season of the show. Following Breaking Bad's conclusion, Gilligan and Gould began developing a Saul-focused spin-off depicting his origin story. Slippin' Jimmy is an animated short-form series which follows his childhood misadventures.

Saul's characterization and Odenkirk's performance received critical acclaim. Odenkirk was nominated for the Primetime Emmy Award for Outstanding Lead Actor in a Drama Series six times for his performance in Better Call Saul tying the record for most nominations without a win in the category.

== Development ==
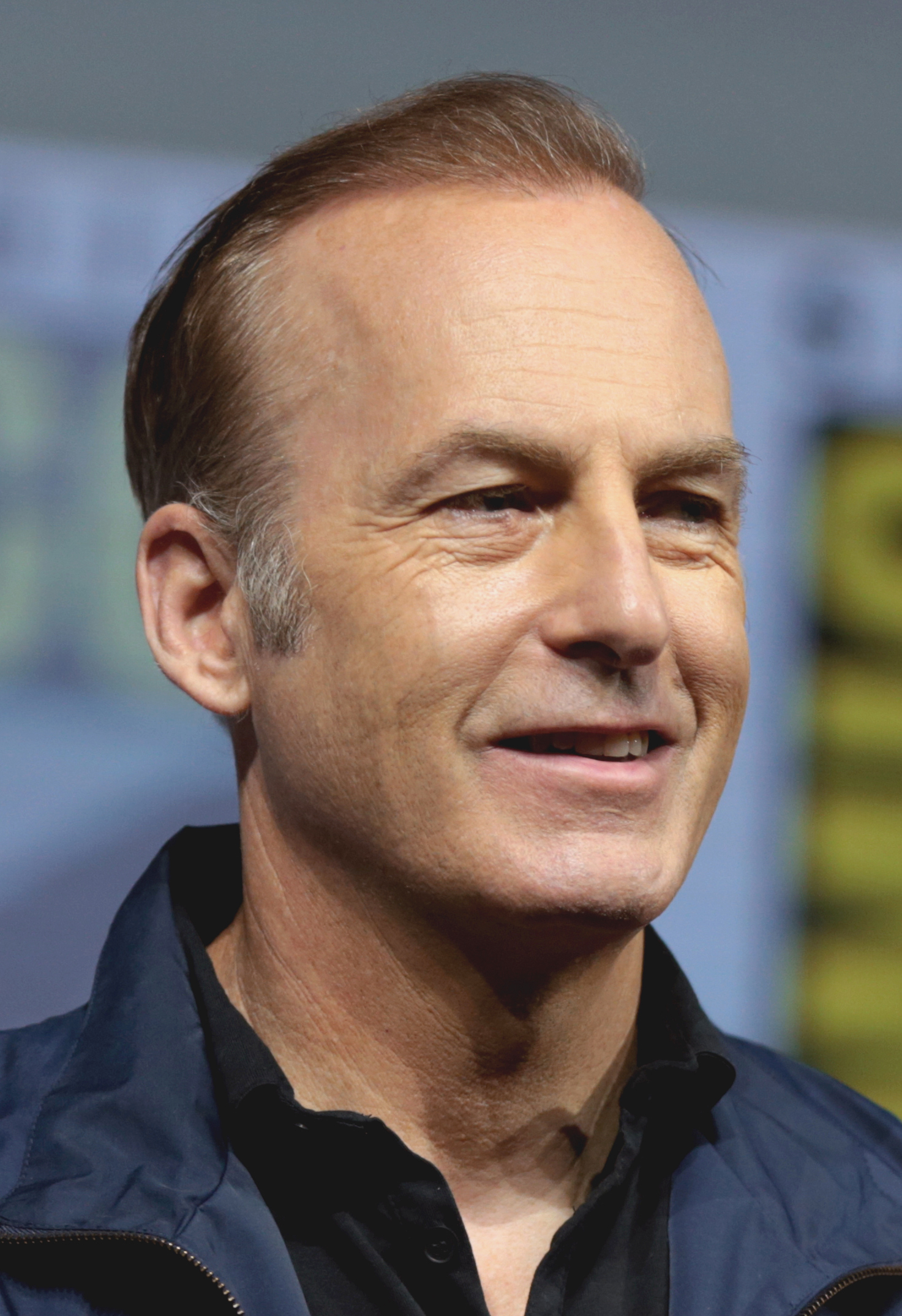
Bob Odenkirk portrays Saul Goodman / Jimmy McGill in both Breaking Bad and Better Call Saul

The need for a character like Saul came from two paths of Breaking Bad's development around the second season. First, as Walter White and Jesse Pinkman grew their drug business, the writers felt they needed a character to be a guide for them. At this point, they had written that Jesse's dimwitted friends like Badger were selling their drugs, and needed to envision what type of lawyer Walt and Jesse would enlist when they run into trouble. This would later serve to introduce Walter to new concepts such as the Disappearer's services. Secondly, they were at a point in Hank Schrader's character arc where he had suffered major trauma in seeing Tortuga's severed head, and he would no longer be able to serve as the series' bit of lightness. They thus made Saul more of a comical character to fill this void. The writers wrote this lawyer as loud, flashy, and over-the-top, as well as being as much of a criminal as the people. The creators decided on the name "Saul Goodman" as a play on the phrase "[It]'s all good, man", so that even his most simple-minded clients would remember his name when they get arrested. Gould credits Breaking Bad's creator Vince Gilligan for initially suggesting this idea for Saul's name.

The Breaking Bad episode "Better Call Saul" was written by Peter Gould, and he has been ultimately credited with creating the character. In terms of casting for the part, both Gilligan and Gould said that their crew included a number of fans of Mr. Show with Bob and David, including Gould's wife Nora, and Odenkirk's name quickly came up for the role. Gilligan offered Odenkirk a four-episode guest role without the need to audition. Odenkirk at the time had been focused on mentoring upcoming actors in comedy, and, needing an opportunity, readily took the role at the encouragement of his friend Reid Harrison, having not seen any of Breaking Bad and thinking that it was only intended for a short stint. Odenkirk watched available episodes of Breaking Bad before arriving for shooting and avoided reading the script he had been sent knowing that it would likely be trimmed down before filming. Odenkirk based the character's speaking style on producer Robert Evans, and spent time practicing speaking in Evans' style based on the autobiography The Kid Stays in the Picture. Bryan Cranston helped Odenkirk to learn more about what Breaking Bad was about and to coach him on dramatic acting, something which Odenkirk lacked from his comedy background. Odenkirk was scheduled to appear in the second-season finale, but a prior commitment on How I Met Your Mother left him unable to do so; this led Gilligan to create the character of Mike Ehrmantraut, played by Jonathan Banks, to serve in place of Saul for that fourth episode.

Saul was originally intended to appear in only four episodes of the second season of Breaking Bad, but instead became central to the narrative of the series. Though originally written as a "two-and-a-half-dimensional" comic relief character, Saul's role became more in-depth, as Gilligan and Gould found they could use Saul as a "further entree to the criminal underbelly" for Walt in the later seasons. This also allowed them to give the character more humanity, which the showrunners credited to Odenkirk's acting skills. They considered that like with Aaron Paul and Dean Norris, Odenkirk's acting capability significantly altered plans they had for these characters and the series in a beneficial manner, making them more central to the larger plot. As Saul had proven to be a popular character with audiences, Gilligan and Gould already had started thinking about a spin-off involving Saul and approached Odenkirk on his interest to make it happen. Odenkirk had initially turned down the continuing role, wanting to be with his family in Los Angeles and feeling he had enough fame with the success of Breaking Bad, but his children assured them that they would be fine and he should not turn the opportunity down.

Once Breaking Bad was completed, Gilligan and Gould worked to establish what the spin-off series would be about, ultimately coming onto the idea of a prequel named Better Call Saul that would feature Jimmy McGill and how he would become Saul Goodman. The showrunners realized that Saul was, as seen in Breaking Bad, "comfortable in his own skin" and had nowhere else to go, that they could instead explore how Saul got to that point, mirroring the same type of self-destruction that occurred to Walter White in Breaking Bad. They saw Jimmy as an "earnest, sweet guy whose brain naturally cooks up dishonest solutions to the challenges in front of him", where by the time of Breaking Bad, Saul is a "front" for one who "seemed to enjoy being a showy cheeseball", and a "hermetically sealed slickster". Rhea Seehorn, who plays Kim Wexler, Jimmy's romantic interest in Better Call Saul, said that one aspect of Jimmy she incorporated into her acting was the spontaneity of Jimmy slipping into and out of the Saul Goodman character, or as Gould had described to her, "right there at the moment", a factor that for Kim and other associates of Jimmy can cause confusion and concern.

Breaking Bad established little of Saul's origins, but revealed that Saul Goodman was not his real name and that his real last name was McGill. This gave Gilligan, Gould, and Odenkirk a chance to flesh out more of Jimmy's backstory for Better Call Saul. Odenkirk and Gilligan set Jimmy's hometown as Chicagoland (specifically Cicero), in part as Odenkirk was from nearby Berwyn, as well as a homage to the notorious corruption in the political history of Chicago as inspiration for the character.

In 2014, as a publicity stunt for the launch of Better Call Saul, a billboard for "James M. McGill, Attorney at Law" was placed in Albuquerque, mimicking a billboard that appeared on the series, with a phone number connecting to a voicemail message recorded by Odenkirk.

In conceiving the story for El Camino: A Breaking Bad Movie, which continues Jesse Pinkman's story after the events of the Breaking Bad series finale, Gilligan considered including Saul, feeling that using him in the story would have been great. However, Gilligan eventually desisted from including him due to being unaware of the potential plans Gould and the Better Call Saul writers could have for the character in his show, as Gilligan left the writers' room of the show after the third season.

== Biography ==
=== Background ===
Jimmy is of Irish descent and was born on November 12, 1960, to Charles Willard McGill and Ruth McGill, in Cicero, Illinois, near Chicago. His older brother Chuck became a successful lawyer as one of the partners at Albuquerque law firm Hamlin, Hamlin & McGill (HHM). As a child, Jimmy worked at his parents' corner store in Cicero, and watched as customers took advantage of his gullible, naive father; Jimmy soon began pilfering small change from the store.

Determined not to end up like his father, Jimmy became a con artist and earned the nickname "Slippin' Jimmy" for staging "slip and fall" accidents. He also ran petty scams including the "fake Rolex" with the help of his best friend and partner-in-crime Marco Pasternak. Jimmy began to use the alias "Saul Goodman", a play on the phrase "It's all good, man". He initially used it as a fake name when performing his scams with Marco. He would much later use the alternative identity for the high-energy pitchman in television ads he produced, and made when he began a business reselling prepaid cell phones on the street. During high school, Jimmy also produced fake IDs and sold them to his friends so they could buy beer.

At some point in the past, Jimmy had been married and divorced twice. One of his ex-wives cheated on him with a man named Chet. Jimmy ran into trouble when he drunkenly defecated through the sunroof of Chet's car, an act he calls a "Chicago Sunroof"; unbeknownst to Jimmy, Chet's children were inside the vehicle. Arrested and facing the possibility of having to register as a sex offender, and in spite of a five-year separation from his family, Jimmy turned to Chuck for help. Chuck successfully defended Jimmy, but required that Jimmy move to Albuquerque and work a legitimate job in HHM's mail room.

While working in the HHM mail room, Jimmy befriended Kim Wexler, an HHM employee attending the University of New Mexico School of Law. Over time, their friendship turned romantic. Inspired by her success and Chuck's career, Jimmy resumed his education, completing his undergraduate degree and then a J.D. from the (fictional) University of American Samoa's correspondence law school. He passed the bar exam hoping to be hired at HHM, but Chuck secretly compelled senior partner Howard Hamlin to deny Jimmy the opportunity. Jimmy then began a solo practice as a lawyer, basing his office in the utility room of a Vietnamese nail salon at a strip mall. During this period, he took whatever cases he could get, including low-paying public defender work.

Some years later, near the time of Chuck's divorce with Rebecca, Chuck developed a psychosomatic aversion to electricity and became semi-reclusive. Jimmy cared for Chuck, bringing him groceries and running his errands. However, Jimmy still struggled with finances, and drove a signature Suzuki Esteem with mismatched doors (a visual pun reflecting Jimmy's poor self-esteem). While arriving at and departing from court, Jimmy frequently butted heads with Mike Ehrmantraut, a former Philadelphia police officer who at that time worked as the courthouse parking lot attendant. On one day of doing errands for Chuck, the older brother attempted to let Jimmy confide in him about his unsatisfying public defender work and tell him it's never too late to change his path, but Jimmy assumes he's looking down on him like usual and rebukes this; Chuck responds "We always end up having the same conversations." (Note: As shown in a flashback in the Better Call Saul episode "Saul Gone".)

=== Better Call Saul ===
==== Season 1 ====
Unhappy with low-paying public defender work and other minor cases, Jimmy hopes to represent county treasurer Craig Kettleman and his wife Betsy, a couple accused of embezzling over $1.6 million. They retain HHM, but Jimmy's attempts to represent them leads to an encounter with Tuco Salamanca and Nacho Varga, members of the Juárez Cartel. When Nacho plans to rob the Kettlemans, Jimmy anonymously warns them, and their home later appears to have been the scene of a kidnapping. Nacho, who had been seen surveilling the Kettlemans, is arrested, and Jimmy defends him and obtains his release.

Following a hunch from Mike, Jimmy discovers the Kettlemans staged their disappearance and are hiding in the foothills behind their home. When he confronts them, the Kettlemans pay him $30,000 not to turn over the money. HHM later suggests the Kettlemans take a plea bargain, so they turn to Jimmy for defense. With Kim punished by HHM for losing the case, Jimmy works with Mike to find the Kettlemans' hiding place. Mike steals the cash and delivers it to the district attorney, forcing Craig to return to HHM and accept the guilty plea.

Jimmy starts to produce wills for several elderly clients, exhibiting patience and great rapport, so Kim suggests he focus on an elder law practice. During a visit to the Sandpiper Crossing retirement home, he finds the company is committing fraud by overcharging clients. With Chuck's help, he finds a document that proves the fraud, and Jimmy and Chuck begin a class action lawsuit against Sandpiper. When the case grows too big for just them, Chuck suggests turning it over to HHM, but secretly arranges with Howard to cut Jimmy out of the subsequent litigation.

Jimmy confronts Chuck, who admits that he resents Jimmy's legal career, believing he is still a con artist at heart. Jimmy returns to Cicero and spends a week running cons with Marco, who dies of a heart attack as they run what they planned to be their last scam together. Jimmy returns to Albuquerque when Kim calls to say that the Sandpiper case has continued to grow, so HHM has brought in another firm, Davis & Main. Knowing he understands the details of the case better than anyone and has developed personal relationships with the clients, Kim persuades Davis & Main to hire Jimmy as an associate. Jimmy prepares to meet with the Davis & Main partners, but has second thoughts and drives away.

==== Season 2 ====
Jimmy hides out at a hotel while vacationing under an assumed name with a stolen credit card. Kim finds Jimmy and persuades him to reconsider joining Davis & Main, so he accepts their offer, but not before they pull one last con on an obnoxious wealth manager together. Assigned to enroll new clients for the Sandpiper case, Jimmy succeeds at signing up more residents, but his skirting of the ethical canons leads Chuck to chastise him in front of the other attorneys. Jimmy produces and airs a television ad without the approval of the D&M partners or the knowledge of the partners at HHM, leading to a reprimand and a junior attorney assigned to constantly supervise him.

Kim is relegated to menial document review work as the result of her failure to inform HHM about Jimmy's commercial. In an effort to reclaim her status at HHM, Kim works her contacts to bring in a new client and succeeds at landing Mesa Verde Bank. Howard is happy to have the business, but denies Kim credit. Jimmy proposes that they go into partnership together. Kim counters with a proposal that they start separate practices in a shared office, so Jimmy quits D&M (by misbehaving at work to get himself fired so he can keep his signing bonus), Kim quits HHM, and they begin their new firms. Kim succeeds at winning Mesa Verde as a client, but Chuck persuades Mesa Verde to remain with HHM.

Chuck's attempts to hide his electromagnetic sensitivity during the meeting with Mesa Verde causes him to become severely ill, and his caregiver Ernesto calls Jimmy for help. While Chuck sleeps, Jimmy alters Mesa Verde documents stored at Chuck's house. As a result, Chuck's application to the state banking board for a new Mesa Verde branch is incorrect, leading to a significant delay. Mesa Verde fires HHM and hires Kim, and Chuck suspects that Jimmy sabotaged him. Kim infers Jimmy's guilt and tells him that if he left any evidence, Chuck will find it.

Knowing the copy store clerk where he altered the documents can identify him, Jimmy goes to the store to buy his silence, but sees Ernesto questioning the clerk. After Ernesto leaves to pick up Chuck and bring him back to question the clerk, Jimmy enters the store and bribes the clerk. He then waits across the street and observes as Chuck questions the clerk, only for his EHS causes him to faint and hit his head. Jimmy is torn between helping Chuck and keeping secret his alteration of the Mesa Verde documents, but comes to Chuck's aid and Chuck is transported to the hospital. He wonders how Jimmy arrived at the store so quickly after his accident and guesses that Jimmy bribed the clerk and stayed nearby to see what would happen when Chuck arrived; Ernesto lies and claims he called Jimmy before bringing Chuck to the store out of concern for his health. Chuck's doctor proves to Jimmy that Chuck's EHS symptoms are psychosomatic, but Jimmy agrees to keep caring for him. Chuck makes Jimmy believe that he intends to quit being a lawyer and has a breakdown over his supposed mistake, tricking him into confessing to the Mesa Verde fraud, which Chuck secretly records.

==== Season 3 ====
Chuck arranges for Jimmy to learn of the recording through Ernesto and Kim, enraging Jimmy enough to break into Chuck's house to destroy it. A private investigator Chuck hired and Howard witness Jimmy's actions, enabling Chuck to report him to the police.

Jimmy is arrested, but Chuck tells the prosecutor he prefers having Jimmy submit to a bar association disciplinary hearing to pursuing a criminal case. In order to prevent Jimmy from getting disbarred, he and Kim make Chuck's mental fitness an issue when he testifies, and Jimmy questions him about his hypersensitivity. Jimmy reveals that he had Huell Babineaux, a pickpocket, place Jimmy's cell phone battery in Chuck's pocket during the hearing, and that Chuck carried it for over an hour without experiencing symptoms. The suggestion that his illness is not real causes Chuck to have a meltdown and vent all his frustrations about Jimmy and his many unethical actions in a tirade that stuns the hearing room audience.

Jimmy's law license is suspended for a year, but he is not disbarred. To both pay his share of the rent on the office and make use of TV ad time for which he has already prepaid, Jimmy begins producing commercials for other businesses while using the on-air alias "Saul Goodman". Jimmy attempts to obtain a refund of his malpractice insurance premium but finds that the insurance must stay in force in case he is sued over past cases while his license is suspended. Jimmy pretends to break down while informing the insurance carrier about Chuck's condition, an act calculated to get the carrier to raise Chuck's malpractice insurance premiums. The insurance carrier informs Chuck and Howard that HHM's insurance rates will rise dramatically unless Chuck is continually supervised by another attorney. Chuck wants to fight, but Howard pays the first of three installments that enable him to buy out Chuck's partnership, and forces Chuck to retire.

Jimmy learns of a proposed settlement of the Sandpiper case, of which his share will be more than a million dollars, but finds that Irene, the lawsuit's class representative, has turned it down because the lawyers have advised her that they can obtain a bigger settlement by waiting. Jimmy executes several actions designed to trick Irene into accepting the settlement but feels remorse when her friends ostracize her. When he attempts to confess, her friends believe he is covering for her, so he arranges for them to overhear him bragging about tricking them. Irene is vindicated and her friendships are restored, but Jimmy's confession means he will not immediately receive his share of the settlement, and loses the trust of all his elderly clients. Kim takes on a second client in order to generate the income necessary to keep their office, but falls asleep at the wheel while driving to a meeting and breaks her arm. Jimmy and Kim later decide to close the office and Kim runs her practice from her apartment.

Jimmy attempts to make amends with Chuck, but Chuck rebuffs him, claiming that Jimmy never mattered all that much to him. Later, Chuck's EHS symptoms become more severe and he removes all the appliances from his house and pulls out the wiring in an effort to discover what is causing his electricity meter to keep running. Chuck's condition continues to deteriorate, and he eventually purposely kicks over a gas lantern and starts a fatal fire.

==== Season 4 ====
Jimmy is devastated by Chuck's death, until Howard reveals that his death was a suicide, not an accident. Realizing that he indirectly caused his brother's death, Jimmy feigns indifference, conceals his role in the insurance issue, and allows Howard to accept the blame.

While job hunting, Jimmy spots an opportunity to steal a valuable Hummel figurine from the owner of a copier store, which he hires professional thief Ira to do. While managing a cell phone store, Jimmy uses his token inheritance from Chuck to begin a lucrative side business reselling prepaid phones on the street, again making use of the Saul Goodman alias. Kim becomes bored with practicing banking law for Mesa Verde, and begins accepting pro bono criminal defense cases, which she finds more satisfying. Kim persuades Schweikart & Cokely, the firm representing Sandpiper, to hire her as a partner in charge of a new banking division, but tells Jimmy that senior partner Rich Schweikart sought her out.

Near the end of Jimmy's probation, a plainclothes police officer questions him about his cell phone side business. Huell, working as Jimmy's bodyguard, misunderstands the interaction and strikes the cop over the head with a bag of sandwiches, leading to an assault charge. The assistant district attorney prosecuting the case seeks a sentence of several years in prison because Huell is a repeat offender. Jimmy enlists Kim's aid to defend Huell, but she refuses to ruin the cop's reputation. Instead, Kim and Jimmy arrange for a false show of support for Huell that results in the prosecutor accepting a plea bargain that keeps him out of prison. After the two have been growing apart over the course of the past year, Kim is elated by the thrill of the scam and convinces Jimmy to help her run a con to replace city-approved plans for a Mesa Verde branch in Lubbock, Texas with plans for a bigger building.

Jimmy's request for reinstatement to the bar is denied and he learns it was because he failed to show remorse for Chuck's death. To prepare for his appeal, Kim and Jimmy carry out several public displays that enable him to fake grief, including dedicating a law library reading room in Chuck's name at the University of New Mexico. Jimmy makes a speech to the appeal panel about wanting to do justice to the McGill name, convincing them to reinstate his law license. He then shocks Kim by revealing that the speech was an insincere con. He obtains a DBA application and announces he intends to resume practicing law as Saul Goodman.

==== Season 5 ====
Jimmy tells Kim the notoriety of the Saul Goodman name used in reselling prepaid phones gives him a ready-made client base for a criminal law practice. He offers to help Kim trick a reluctant client to accept a favorable plea bargain; she refuses, but later runs the con alone, which leaves her angry at herself. Mesa Verde Bank intends to evict a man named Everett Acker from leased land to make way for a new call center, and offers Acker a meager settlement. Kim sympathizes with Acker and has Jimmy become his counsel. Jimmy employs delaying tactics in hopes of swaying the bank to accept an alternative to Acker's eviction, but Kevin, the bank's president, is adamant. With Rich threatening to pull Kim off the Mesa Verde case, Kim asks Jimmy to persuade Acker to accept an improved settlement in which she will make up the difference between what Acker wants and what the bank will pay. Jimmy agrees, but at the meeting to finalize the deal, he surprises everyone with an exorbitant demand and threats of negative publicity against the bank, which leads Kevin to agree to a more favorable deal. Kim is furious at Jimmy for not making her aware of his plan. She then suggests they marry so their conversations will be protected by spousal privilege. They marry the next day in a small courthouse ceremony.

Howard feels guilt over his past treatment of Jimmy and offers him a job at HHM. Jimmy is unsettled by the reminder of his past and harasses Howard by damaging his car with bowling balls and disrupting his business lunch with Clifford Main. Howard realizes Jimmy is toying with him and rescinds the job offer; Jimmy angrily blames Howard for Chuck's death and says that as Saul Goodman, he is too big for the constraints of HHM.

Nacho and Lalo Salamanca involve Jimmy in the Salamanca drug business when they hire him to gain Domingo "Krazy-8" Molina's release from jail by having him pose as a confidential informant for DEA Agent Hank Schrader. Jimmy later represents Lalo when he is arrested for murder under the alias of Jorge de Guzman. Drug kingpin Gus Fring wants Lalo released, so Mike provides information that enables Jimmy to persuade a judge to grant bail of $7 million cash. Jimmy agrees to accept $100,000 in exchange for transporting the money from a remote desert site. He picks up the cash from Leonel and Marco Salamanca (the Cousins), but on his return trip is attacked by several gunmen sent by Juan Bolsa. Mike was tracking Jimmy for Gus and kills all but one attacker. Jimmy's car breaks down, forcing them to hide the car from the remaining attacker and trek cross-country with the money. They walk for two days and work together to kill the remaining gunman. While walking, they come across a water trough and stop to relax. Jimmy asks Mike what he would do if he had a time machine and 1 million dollars. Mike initially says he would go back to the day his son, Matty, died but changes his answer to the day he took his first bribe. When Mike asks Jimmy the same thing, Jimmy dishonestly tells Mike he would invest in Berkshire Hathaway and become a billionaire. Mike questions if Jimmy would change anything but Jimmy deflects the question. (Note: As shown in a flashback in "Saul Gone".) Eventually Jimmy's phone gets a signal and he calls Kim to tell her that he is okay before he calls for help. Tyrus Kitt and Victor arrive to pick Mike and Jimmy up and on the ride back Mike tells Jimmy he must come up with a believable story for Lalo. The events leave Jimmy suffering from post-traumatic stress.

After posting Lalo's bail, Jimmy tells Lalo he walked cross-country alone after his car broke down so he would not risk losing the money. Jimmy tells Kim the same story, but she sees his shot travel mug and realizes he is lying. Kim tells him she will be ready to listen when he is ready to tell her the truth. Jimmy cuts his recuperation short to deal with clients at the courthouse. When he returns that night, Kim tells him she quit Schweikart & Cokely and gave up the Mesa Verde account. As they argue, Mike phones to warn Jimmy that instead of going to Mexico, Lalo is en route to Jimmy and Kim's apartment. As Mike listens in via Jimmy's concealed cell phone and trains a sniper rifle on Lalo, Lalo questions Jimmy's version of events and reveals he found bullet holes in Jimmy's car. Kim stands up to Lalo and berates him for not trusting Jimmy. Lalo seems satisfied and leaves, but Jimmy and Kim move to a hotel for their safety. The next day, Jimmy learns from Mike that Lalo returned to his home in Chihuahua and that Gus has sent hired killers to assassinate him.

Kim tells Howard that she quit S&C, and he assumes it was at Jimmy's instigation, telling her about Jimmy's harassment campaign. Kim laughs at the idea that she is unable to decide for herself, and later suggests that she and Jimmy should get revenge on Howard by forcing a settlement of the Sandpiper case, which will give Jimmy his seven-figure share of the settlement sooner. Jimmy counsels against it but Kim confidently affirms her intent by returning the same finger gun gesture Jimmy used when announcing he intended to practice law as Saul Goodman. (Note: This is a reversal of the roles from the final scene of the fourth season finale episode "Winner", when Jimmy reveals to Kim he plans to practice law under the name "Saul Goodman" and gives her the same gesture as he walks off.)

==== Season 6 ====
Jimmy and Kim begin their plotting against Howard. Prosecutor Suzanne Ericsen informs Jimmy they are aware "Jorge de Guzman" is an alias and asks if he knows his client's real identity. Jimmy denies it but accidentally uses Lalo Salamanca's real name. Kim surveils Cliff Main and Howard Hamlin at the golf course while Jimmy sneaks into the locker room to plant a bag resembling cocaine in Howard's locker. Howard and Cliff find it, but Howard dismisses it as an employee's mistake or a prank.

At Kim's instigation, Jimmy cons the Kettlemans into believing they have grounds for a lawsuit against Howard. The couple attempt to hire Cliff to represent them, claiming Howard provided ineffective counsel because he used cocaine during his representation of Craig Kettleman. Cliff declines, as do several other lawyers, but Jimmy and Kim succeed in spreading the rumor that Howard uses drugs. Jimmy later attempts to bribe the Kettlemans into remaining silent about their role in smearing Howard. When they refuse the cash, Kim coerces them by threatening to reveal their shady tax return scam to the IRS. Jimmy disappoints Kim by giving the Kettlemans the cash before he leaves.

Suzanne approaches Kim to say she has identified de Guzman as Lalo Salamanca, and that Lalo is dead. Suzanne has also connected Jimmy to the Salamanca drug family and asks Kim to approach him about becoming an informant. Kim informs Jimmy about the conversation and asks if he intends to be a "friend of the cartel" or a "rat". Jimmy and Kim work with Huell and Huell's associate to copy Howard's car key and remote unlock button. Huell asks Jimmy why legitimate lawyers would commit crimes and Jimmy makes an unconvincing argument about doing wrong to accomplish a greater good.

Jimmy discovers his representation of Lalo Salamanca has made him a pariah with courthouse staff, but a highly sought-after defense attorney among Albuquerque's criminals. The influx of new clients causes Mrs. Nguyen to evict him from the nail salon, so he begins searching for an office. He identifies a vacancy in a strip mall, which he decides to rent because of its proximity to the courthouse, the county jail, and the city's bail bonds offices. His business starts to grow, and Jimmy succeeds in persuading Francesca Liddy to work as his administrative assistant. As Kim meets with Cliff Main at an outdoor café, Jimmy disguises himself as Howard and takes Howard's car while Howard is visiting his therapist. Jimmy pushes a prostitute named Wendy out of the car in front of Cliff and Kim, further suggesting to Cliff that Howard is using cocaine and prostitutes.

Cliff confronts Howard about his supposed cocaine use. Howard recognizes Jimmy is continuing to harass him, so he tricks Jimmy into meeting him at a boxing gym. Howard challenges Jimmy to a bout, and Jimmy declines, but then changes his mind and enters the ring. Howard defeats him and says he hopes this ends Jimmy's harassment, but afterward, Howard directs his private investigator to begin surveilling Jimmy.

During a meeting with Viola Goto, her former paralegal, Kim obtains the name of the retired judge who will mediate an upcoming settlement conference for the Sandpiper case. Jimmy and his film crew fabricate photos that include an actor made up to resemble the mediator. Jimmy later sees the mediator at a store and tells Kim he has a broken arm in a cast, which is not depicted in the photos. Kim abandons her plan to meet in Santa Fe with Cliff Main and representatives of a foundation interested in funding her pro bono criminal defense work and returns to Albuquerque to help Jimmy hastily re-shoot the photos.

Howard's investigator delivers the photos to Howard shortly before the mediation session begins. They depict the mediator accepting money from Jimmy and are coated in a drug that causes Howard's pupils to dilate. He angrily accuses the mediator of accepting a bribe, and when he attempts to retrieve the photos as proof, he discovers they have been switched for innocuous pictures of Jimmy. As Jimmy and Kim listen in on the conference call, Howard is humiliated in front of his clients and peers, and HHM and Davis & Main agree to settle the Sandpiper case; satisfied by the successful con, Jimmy and Kim have sex. After the mediation concludes, Howard pieces together the whole plot, including how they caused him to rely on a fake private investigator. That night, he arrives at Kim's apartment to confront her and Jimmy about all their actions. Unexpectedly, an alive Lalo Salamanca arrives soon afterward; Howard disregards Kim and Jimmy's entreaties to leave immediately, and Lalo kills Howard with a gunshot to the head.

Lalo gives Jimmy a loose description of Gus Fring and instructs him to drive to Gus' house and shoot him; Jimmy convinces Lalo to send Kim instead. Lalo restrains Jimmy and asks about his involvement with the raid on Lalo's house, revealing that the attack was the result of Nacho betraying him and letting assassins in; Jimmy disclaims knowledge and blames Nacho. Lalo leaves the house to go to Gus' secret laundry lab, but says he will return to resume the interrogation. Gus recognizes Kim's arrival at his house as a diversion and heads to his laundry. Unknown to Jimmy, Gus kills Lalo. Mike and his men arrive at the apartment and free Jimmy. Kim is reunited with him the following morning; Mike tells them they will not see Lalo again and stages Howard's death to look like a suicide. He also instructs them to make the suicide story plausible by maintaining their ruse about Howard's drug addiction, and warns them never to reveal the truth.

Jimmy and Kim attend Howard's memorial at HHM and learn the firm will downsize and rebrand. Jimmy tells Howard's widow Cheryl that he could have been nicer to Howard, but was jealous because Howard had Chuck's respect, while he did not. After Kim decides to stop being an attorney, he begs her to reconsider, but she tearfully refuses, confesses her guilt over ruining Howard's life and says she believes she and Jimmy will hurt everyone around them if they stay together. Kim leaves Jimmy and they divorce in 2004. Kim refuses to take her share of the Sandpiper settlement money and moves to Florida. After the papers are signed Jimmy calls for his next client, Emilio Koyama. Outside, Kim meets Emilio's friend, Jesse Pinkman, who asks if Jimmy is "any good". Kim tells Jesse that he was when she knew him.

In a flashforward, Jimmy has fully embraced his Saul Goodman persona, as exemplified by his acquisition of a sprawling mansion (decorated in ostentatious motifs redolent of Bob Guccione's townhouse on New York's Upper East Side) and a white Cadillac DeVille. He begins work upon waking, regularly employs prostitutes (offering an energy bar to a departing sex worker while he multitasks), and mentions his alprazolam dealer to Francesca on a preparatory phone call. His office has been renovated, and includes an inflatable Statue of Liberty on the roof and wallpaper resembling the United States Constitution.

=== Breaking Bad ===
By the time of Jimmy's introduction in Breaking Bad, he has fully adopted the identity of "Saul Goodman", and rarely mentions the name Jimmy McGill. Saul is an astutely aggressive defense attorney, aided by his working knowledge of Spanish, but also engages in questionable, as well as blatantly criminal activity, such as money laundering. Mike now works as Saul's private investigator, as well as doing odd-jobs for Saul. Saul has also rehired Huell as his bodyguard and security for his office. Saul has gained ties to Gus Fring, the owner of the fast-food chicken franchise Los Pollos Hermanos, likely through Mike, which Gus uses as a front to smuggle cocaine from the Juárez drug cartel. He also at some point purchases a black book from Dr. Caldera, an Albuquerque veterinarian with ties to nearly all criminals in the area, with Saul now obtaining all of this knowledge and resources.

==== Season 2 ====
In 2008, after a drug dealer named Brandon "Badger" Mayhew is arrested, Saul offers to be Badger's legal counsel and learns that the DEA hopes Badger will lead them to "Heisenberg", an up-and-coming drug lord. Worried meth cooks Walter White (who is "Heisenberg") and Jesse Pinkman decide to visit Saul to convince him to not let Badger talk to the DEA. Walt poses as Badger's uncle and goes to Saul's office, where he learns that Saul will advise Badger to reveal his associates in order to avoid prison. Walt offers Saul a bribe to keep Badger from "flipping", but Saul refuses. Later that night, Walt and Jesse kidnap Saul and drive out to the middle of the desert, threatening to kill him if he does not keep Badger from informing. Saul initially believes Lalo sent them and blames Nacho for assisting in the attack on Lalo at his home. Upon realizing Walt and Jesse are not associated with Lalo, he takes a token payment so he can give them legal advice protected by attorney-client privilege. Saul expresses awe at their mobile meth lab and correctly identifies Walt as Heisenberg. Jesse asks Saul about Lalo, but Saul brushes off the question, saying that Lalo is "nobody".

Saul meets with them later and tells them about Jimmy "In-'N-Out" Kilkelly, who makes a living confessing to the crimes of others and going to prison. Saul arranges for Kilkelly to be arrested and confess to being Heisenberg. The DEA busts Kilkelly when Badger meets with him for a drug deal, but Hank is not completely convinced. Later, Saul hires Mike to look into Heisenberg and Mike identifies Walt for him, but warns Saul against getting involved with him, seeing him as an amateur. (Note: As shown in the Better Call Saul episode "Breaking Bad".) Seeing potential in profiting off of their business, Saul visits Walt at the school where he works, informing him he was too easy to find, and offers to be Walt's full-time legal counsel, money launderer, and adviser. Walt accepts and Saul becomes Walt and Jesse's lawyer and consigliere.

Combo, Jesse's friend and a meth dealer for Jesse and Walt, is killed by a rival gang, and Jesse's friends refuse to continue selling meth. Saul promises to contact another dealer, Gus, though he warns them Gus is very selective when deciding with whom to work. Walt ultimately convinces Gus to buy his latest batch for nearly a million dollars, but Gus expresses strong reservations about Jesse's trustworthiness because of his obvious drug use.

When Walt complains to Saul that he cannot actually use the money he makes, Saul tells Walt he could launder his money through the website his son, Walter Jr., set up, "SaveWalterWhite.com". Saul contacts a hacker in Belarus who can make it look like real donations are coming into the website, when in reality the money is all Walt's. Later, when Jesse's girlfriend Jane Margolis dies of a heroin overdose, Saul sends Mike to remove all evidence of drug use and to coach Jesse into saying what he needs to say to remove suspicion.

==== Season 3 ====
Saul helps Jesse anonymously buy his aunt's house back from his parents with his share of the drug money. Saul and Mike bug Skyler White's (Walt's wife) house to find out if she has told anyone about Walt's secrets. Saul attempts to get Jesse to convince Walt to resume cooking methamphetamine. After an altercation between Walt and Skyler's boss Ted Beneke, Mike brings Walt to Saul. Walt later figures out that Saul has been bugging his house and attacks him, causing Saul to refuse to launder any more money through Walter Jr.'s website. Jesse visits Saul with the methamphetamine he produced and asks for a meeting with Gus, at which Gus agrees to buy Jesse's product, assuming it will be an incentive to Walt. Saul sets up a meeting between Jesse and Walt to resolve the issue of Jesse's half of the money from their previous work for Gus. Walt agrees to resume meth production for Gus, with Gale Boetticher as his assistant, so Saul changes sides and agrees to launder Walt's new income.

When Walt's brother-in-law Hank Schrader, a DEA agent, is close to catching Jesse in the recreational vehicle Walt and he use as a meth lab and learning that Walt is with him, Walt calls Saul. Saul has his secretary Francesca pose as an Albuquerque Police Department dispatcher falsely claiming that Hank's wife Marie has been in a car accident, luring Hank to the hospital, and giving Jesse and Walt time to destroy the RV. Nevertheless, Saul feels guilty about his part in the cruel ruse. Frustrated at losing his potential arrest of Jesse, Hank attacks Jesse at his home. Saul visits a hospitalized Jesse, who threatens to expose Walt as Heisenberg. Saul suggests killing Jesse, but Walt is against it. Saul tries to convince Jesse to buy commercial properties to launder his money but Jesse rejects the idea. Saul discusses plans for money laundering with Skyler and Walt, floating the idea of buying a laser tag business. Skyler wants to buy Walt's former employer Bogdan's car wash, believing it is a much more plausible front business. Walt visits Saul to discuss Jesse's plan to kill two dealers who work for Gus, and who killed Jesse's friend Combo as well as his girlfriend Andrea's brother Tomás. Mike, who is working for Gus, threatens Saul in order to obtain Jesse's location, intending to break his legs before he acts against the dealers, but Saul sends Mike to the wrong location. Saul then helps Jesse hide and later arranges for Jesse and Walt to meet at the laser tag arcade.

==== Season 4 ====
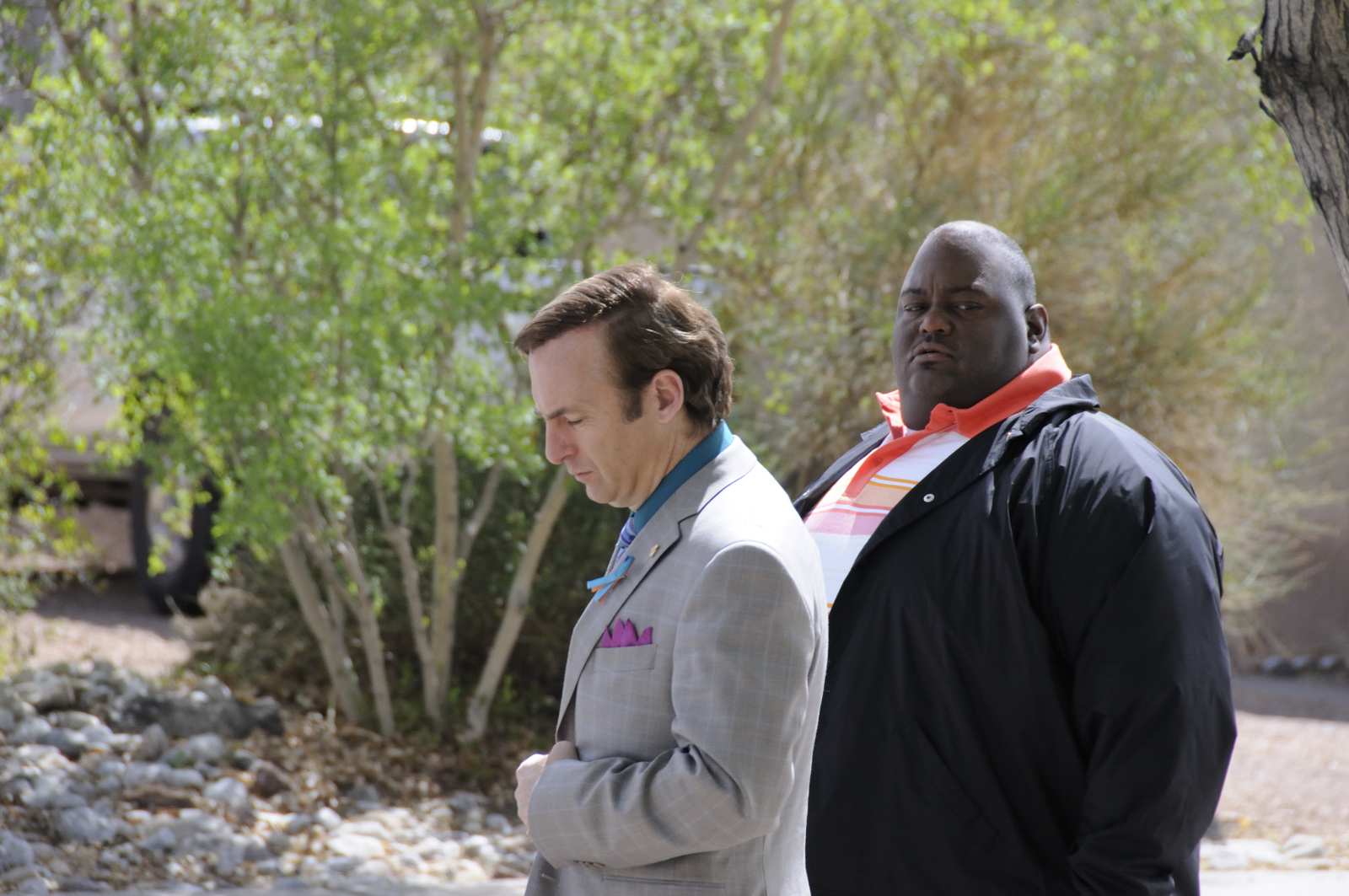
Odenkirk (left) and Lavell Crawford as Saul and Huell during the filming of the fourth season of Breaking Bad

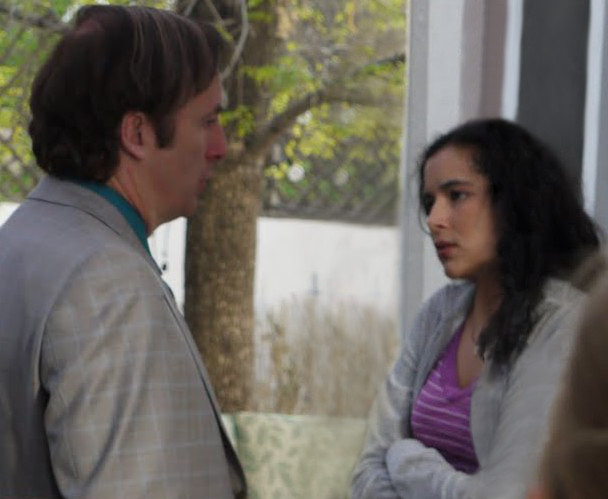
Bob Odenkirk as Saul Goodman on the set of Breaking Bad during the filming of the fourth season, with Emily Rios as Andrea Cantillo

Saul and Skyler plot ways to persuade Bogdan to sell the car wash, but Skyler rules out violence or intimidation. Saul has his employee Patrick Kuby pose as a government inspector to inform Bogdan of supposed environmental concerns that will cost hundreds of thousands of dollars to mitigate. Bogdan sells the car wash to Walt and Skyler, and Skyler takes over day-to-day management. Walt confides in Saul about his concerns with respect to Jesse, Hank, and Gus. Saul tells Walt about the "Disappearer", a vacuum repair shop owner who can provide Walt and his family with new identities if they have to flee. Saul helps ensure the damage to Walt's car after killing Gus' dealers is not discovered, he also dismisses Walt's idea of hiring a hit man to kill Gus. At Jesse's behest, Saul begins visiting Andrea and tries to give her Jesse's cash.

To protect Skyler from the IRS investigation into Beneke's tax fraud, Saul gives him $620,000 of Walt's cash to pay the tax bill by passing off the money as an inheritance from a fake relative. Ted plans to spend the cash, so Saul sends Kuby and Huell to force him to pay the IRS, and after Beneke signs the check he tries to run away, trips, and injures himself. After Gus threatens Walt and his family's life, Walt demands Saul set up a meeting with the Disappearer so his family can escape. Walt then asks Saul to tip off the DEA about Gus putting a hit out on Hank. Saul agrees but refuses to mention Gus' name. Saul persuades Jesse to come to his office and has Huell secretly steal the ricin cigarette Walt gave Jesse to use in killing Gus. Saul gives Jesse his money and tells him to leave Albuquerque for his own safety. Andrea's son Brock is poisoned and Jesse notices his ricin is gone, figuring that is what poisoned him and believes Walt is responsible. Walt persuades Jesse that Gus poisoned Brock, so Jesse agrees to help him kill Gus. Saul goes into hiding but returns to represent Jesse when he is questioned about Brock's poisoning. Saul discovers from Jesse that Gus regularly visits Hector Salamanca in a nursing home. Saul passes the information to Walt, who then uses it in his plot to ambush and kill Gus.

==== Season 5 ====
===== Part 1 =====
Saul tells Skyler about Beneke's accident, which has left him hospitalized and immobile. Walt is angry with Saul about the payment to Beneke, while Saul is upset at Walt for using him in the scheme to poison Brock. He attempts to end his relationship with Walt, but Walt intimidates him into continuing their business arrangement. With Gus dead, Saul tries to convince Walt to stop making meth, but Walt says he has to continue because he needs the cash. Saul hosts a meeting between Mike, Jesse, and Walt, where they agree to set up a new meth-producing business. Saul helps Walt and Jesse look for new locations, and they agree on Ira's business, Vamonos Pest Control, as the best option. Saul defends Mike from the DEA's investigation by threatening litigation over their supposed harassment. The DEA learns that Mike's lawyer Dan Wachsberger is the conduit for Mike's hush money payments to Gus' former employees and Mike's hiding of cash for his daughter-in-law Stacey and granddaughter Kaylee. Mike asks Saul to retrieve his "go bag", which contains cash and false identity documents. Saul is unable, so Walt does it. When Mike refuses to divulge the names of Gus' former employees so Walt can have them killed to protect his identity, Walt shoots and kills him. Saul continues to numbingly rake in the money as Walt's empire skyrockets.

===== Part 2 =====
Jesse tries to have Saul take the $5 million he made stealing a trainload of methylamine and distribute it to Kaylee and the parents of Drew Sharp, a young boy Todd Alquist killed during the theft. Saul refuses, saying it would attract more police scrutiny. Jesse attempts to get rid of the money in other ways, including throwing it onto random lawns and leaving it in random mailboxes. Saul calls Walt to inform him of Jesse's erratic behavior.

Walt visits Saul to tell him that Hank has learned that Walt is Heisenberg. Saul suggests killing Hank, but Walt refuses. Jesse is arrested while tossing money from his car, and Saul obtains his release from police custody. Saul arranges a meeting between Walt and Jesse, and Walt convinces Jesse to contact the Disappearer and start a new life. Saul wants Jesse to give up drugs before beginning the trip, but Jesse refuses, so Saul has Huell pickpocket Jesse's cannabis. When Jesse realizes his marijuana was stolen, he figures out that Huell previously stole the ricin cigarette, meaning that Walt did in fact poison Brock and Saul knew. Instead of leaving with the Disappearer, Jesse returns to Saul's office and assaults him. Saul admits he had Huell steal the ricin, but says he did not know what Walt intended. Saul calls Walt to warn him that Jesse knows the truth about what happened to Brock.

Saul meets with Walt and suggests killing Jesse. After the DEA manipulates Huell into telling them what happened to Walt's money, Saul is afraid for his life and meets with Walt at the car wash. Believing his arrest is imminent, Saul prepares to go into hiding. He gathers valuables from his office and gives Francesca a cover story, while she disposes of shredded documents from Saul's law practice. She agrees to be at a telephone booth on November 12 (Jimmy's birthday) at 3 p.m. to receive a call. Saul gives Francesca cash and an attorney's business card and tells her that if she needs help she should say "Jimmy" sent her. (Note: As shown in the cold open of the Better Call Saul episode "Quite a Ride".) Saul and Walt both subsequently contact the Disappearer, Ed Galbraith, who sets up a new life for Saul as Gene Takavic, the manager of a Cinnabon in Omaha, Nebraska.

While waiting inside Ed's basement, Walt attempts to fix a broken heater. Saul asks Walt what he would do with a time machine, which annoys Walt due to his terminology and insists he uses the term "regrets" instead. Walt says he regrets leaving Grey Matter, while Saul says he regrets doing a "Slip-and-Fall" scam which gave him a lasting knee injury. After hearing that Saul used to be a scam artist, Walt realizes that Saul has always been the way that he is and dismissively returns to fixing the heater. (Note: As shown in a flashback in the Better Call Saul episode "Saul Gone".) Later, Walt tries to persuade Saul to go with him instead of going to Omaha and to contact hit men to kill Jack Welker in retaliation for killing Hank, but Saul refuses. Walt tries to intimidate Saul but doubles over in a coughing fit. Saul leaves Walt in Ed's basement and begins his trip to Omaha to start his new life.

=== Post-Breaking Bad ===
Ed refers to Saul in El Camino: A Breaking Bad Movie when Jesse attempts to persuade Ed to help him leave Albuquerque and begin a new life. In addition, a scene in the film shows that the strip mall location of Saul's former law office has become a restaurant and sports bar.

The openings of the premieres of seasons one through five and the last four episodes of season six of Better Call Saul are black-and-white flashforwards that take place after Breaking Bad in the latter half of 2010, showing that after leaving Albuquerque, Saul relocates to Omaha under the alias Gene Takavic, keeping a low profile as the manager of a Cinnabon store in a shopping mall. These scenes show him reminiscing about his past success in private, but wary of anyone recognizing his true identity.

When a taxi driver from Albuquerque named Jeff recognizes him, Gene initially calls Ed for help but then decides mid-call to fix the situation himself. He befriends Jeff's elderly mother, Marion, through which he talks to Jeff about being part of "the game". Gene helps Jeff and his friend Buddy plan a robbery of a department store at the mall. He distracts the mall guards from watching the security cameras, while Jeff steals several items, using a shipping container to transport them out of the store. When they regroup at Jeff's home to celebrate, he reminds them that they have committed several crimes and threatens to turn on them should they reveal his true identity; he then ends their partnership and warns Jeff to not approach him again. The following day he looks at a Saul Goodman-esque suit in the mall before walking away.

As promised, he makes a prearranged phone call to Francesca, who reveals that the authorities have seized all of his known assets and are still looking for him and Jesse. After learning that Kim had asked Francesca about him, Gene calls Kim (who now works at a sprinkler company in Florida), but becomes enraged when she tells him to turn himself in. Gene then enlists Jeff and Buddy in a series of identity theft scams. When Buddy refuses to break into the home of a man dying of cancer, Gene decides to do it himself. The man awakens while Gene lingers in the house, but passes out again; Jeff, meanwhile, panics when he sees a police car on patrol behind him and crashes his taxi, creating a distraction that allows Gene to sneak out undetected. Gene later calls Marion asking her to accompany him in paying Jeff's bail, but a suspicious Marion discovers Gene's true identity as Saul Goodman on her new computer. Gene attempts to intimidate Marion into keeping her discovery secret, but she calls the authorities using her Life Alert button, forcing Gene to flee.

He tries to call Ed while hiding in a dumpster, but he is subsequently arrested by the police. In jail, he calls Bill Oakley and asks him to serve as his advisory counsel. The Government then offers Jimmy a "take-it-or-leave-it" deal of 30 years in jail, but then Jimmy narrates a version of events that places him as a victim and unwilling associate of Walter White, intimidating the prosecution by declaring that he needs to convince only a single juror to avoid a guilty verdict. He manages to improve his deal to just seven years in a prison of his choice in North Carolina, which he tries to reduce even more by trading information about the death of Howard Hamlin, upon which he is informed that Kim had already confessed to what happened to Howard a month prior.

Having been extradited to Albuquerque, Jimmy asks Bill to tell the prosecution that he has further information about Howard's death. While in court, Jimmy, worried about Kim possibly being sued by Howard's widow and representing himself, confesses in open court to all his crimes, including his crucial part in Walter White's drug empire and his role in Chuck's ousting from HHM and ultimate suicide.

Jimmy is sent to a maximum security prison in Colorado, his sentence now 86 years. On the bus to prison, another inmate recognizes Jimmy as Saul Goodman and leads the other inmates in a chant of "Better Call Saul". Later, Kim visits Jimmy, who is now a cook in the prison kitchen, and they share a cigarette. He reveals that he has been giving legal advice to other inmates. In the prison yard, Jimmy gestures his signature finger guns at her as she leaves and silently stands in the prison yard.

== Reception ==
For the first four seasons and season 6A and season 6B of Better Call Saul, Odenkirk was nominated for the Primetime Emmy Award for Outstanding Lead Actor in a Drama Series as well as the Golden Globe Award for Best Actor – Television Series Drama and the Actor Award for Outstanding Performance by a Male Actor in a Drama Series five times each. Odenkirk also received nominations for the Critics' Choice Television Award for Best Actor in a Drama Series for each season, winning the award three times.

Several critics felt that Odenkirk, who had been nominated for each previous season, was a significant Emmy snub at the 72nd Primetime Emmy Awards, also after a campaign on Twitter for Odenkirk to win at the 74th Primetime Emmy Awards, he was felt to have been snubbed again by some Twitter users.

== See also ==
- List of characters in the Breaking Bad franchise
