= Better Call Saul (Breaking Bad) =

- Breaking Bad episode
- Introduction of Saul Goodman (Bob Odenkirk), arriving at the interrogation room to defend Badger
- Episode no.: Season 2 Episode 8
- Directed by: Terry McDonough
- Written by: Peter Gould
- Cinematography by: Michael Slovis
- Editing by: Skip Macdonald
- Original air date: April 26, 2009
- Running time: 47 minutes

Guest appearances
- Bob Odenkirk as Saul Goodman; DJ Qualls as Getz; Krysten Ritter as Jane Margolis; Matt Jones as Badger Mayhew; Steven Michael Quezada as Steven Gomez; Tina Parker as Francesca Liddy

Episode chronology
← Previous "Negro y Azul"	Next → "4 Days Out"
- Breaking Bad season 2

"Better Call Saul" is the eighth episode of the second season of the American television drama series Breaking Bad. It was written by Peter Gould and directed by Terry McDonough. The episode aired on AMC on April 26, 2009.

This episode marks Bob Odenkirk's first appearance as the fast-talking criminal lawyer Saul Goodman in the series. He was promoted to series regular in Season 3 and stayed with the series until the penultimate episode, later reprising the role in the prequel series Better Call Saul.

== Plot ==
After Badger is arrested in a sting operation by the Albuquerque Police, Walter White and Jesse Pinkman look into hiring a shady, flamboyant lawyer named Saul Goodman. Saul has already offered to be Badger's legal counsel. Walt poses as Badger's uncle and goes to Saul's office. Walt offers Saul a bribe to keep Badger from confessing, but Saul refuses.

Walt and Jesse resort to kidnapping Saul, threatening to kill him if he does not keep Badger from informing on them. Initially, Saul pleads for mercy, believing they were sent by a man named "Lalo". He blames this apparent slight towards Lalo on a man named "Ignacio", (Note: This dialogue was the basis for the Better Call Saul characters Nacho Varga and Lalo Salamanca.) and referring to himself as an "amigo del cartel". However, upon realizing that they are not cartel enforcers but are instead associates of Badger, Saul asks for payment so he can legally represent them and keep their talks confidential. Saul tells the duo about a man, Jimmy "In-'N-Out" Kilkelly, who makes a living being paid by other criminals to go to jail, and offers to have him stand in for Heisenberg. The DEA busts Kilkelly when Badger gives them a fake deal, but Hank Schrader is not completely convinced. Later, Saul visits Walt at his school, telling him that he is too easy to find. Saul offers to be Walt's full-time legal counsel and adviser in covering his tracks.

Skyler White goes to work on a Saturday, and Walt notices that she is dressing up for her new job with Ted. Seeing that Hank has holed himself in his house, Walt gives him a motivational speech, talking about how he has not had any fear in his life since he was diagnosed with terminal lung cancer. This helps Hank leave the house, but he still has panic attacks. Meanwhile, Jesse sleeps with Jane Margolis and nurses a growing connection with her, learning that she is in recovery from addiction.

== Production ==
The episode was written by Peter Gould, and directed by Terry McDonough. It aired on AMC in the United States and Canada on April 26, 2009.

Events of this episode are referenced in the sixth season Better Call Saul episode, "Breaking Bad". The episode marks the first appearance of Saul Goodman. Saul's dialog and interactions in "Better Call Saul" became essential elements in setting up characters and plotlines for the spinoff prequel series of the same name. When Walter and Jesse wear masks and try to coerce Saul at gunpoint to accept their case, Saul, having mistaken the two for cartel enforcers, tries to lay blame on a man known as "Ignacio" and asks if "Lalo" sent them. Within Better Call Saul, these were revealed to be Nacho Varga, a member of the Salamanca cartel, and Lalo Salamanca, nephew of Hector Salamanca. Saul further begs to know if they are "friends of the cartel", a phrase that is shown to be something he learned from Lalo while being forced to defend him in court. In Better Call Saul's "Point and Shoot", the origins of Saul's fear of Lalo and what he was blaming Nacho for are revealed.

== Critical reception ==
Donna Bowman of The A.V. Club gave the episode an A, and praised Jesse and Walt's evolving role in the drug world.

In 2019, The Ringer ranked "Better Call Saul" as the twelfth best of the 62 Breaking Bad episodes. Vulture ranked it 25th overall.
