= Nippy (Better Call Saul) =

- Better Call Saul episode
- Promotional poster
- Episode no.: Season 6 Episode 10
- Directed by: Michelle MacLaren
- Written by: Alison Tatlock
- Cinematography by: Paul Donachie
- Editing by: Chris McCaleb; Joey Liew
- Original air date: July 25, 2022
- Running time: 51 minutes

Guest appearances
- Pat Healy as Jeff; Jim O'Heir as Frank; Kelsey Scott as Kathy Deutsch; Max Bickelhaup as Buddy; Carol Burnett as Marion

Episode chronology
← Previous "Fun and Games"	Next → "Breaking Bad"
- Better Call Saul season 6

"Nippy" is the tenth episode of the sixth season of Better Call Saul, the spin-off television series of Breaking Bad. It was directed by Michelle MacLaren and written by Alison Tatlock. The episode aired on AMC and AMC+ on July 25, 2022, before debuting online in select territories on Netflix the following day. "Nippy" continues the story of Jimmy McGill, portrayed by Bob Odenkirk, after he changed his identity and relocated to Omaha following the events of Breaking Bad. In the episode, Jimmy confronts Jeff, the taxi driver who identified Jimmy as Saul Goodman.

"Nippy" received generally positive reviews, particularly for Tatlock's screenplay, MacLaren's direction, and Odenkirk's performance. However, the casting and performance of Pat Healy drew mixed reviews, and some felt the episode had little purpose in the show's narrative. An estimated 1.20 million viewers saw the episode during its first broadcast on AMC.

== Plot ==
In Omaha, Nebraska, in 2010, the motorized chair of an elderly woman named Marion gets stuck in the snow. Jimmy McGill, under the guise of Gene Takavic, stealthily snips the chair's power cables and offers to push her home. He befriends her with stories of Nippy, his supposedly missing dog. Marion is the mother of Jeff, the Omaha cab driver who identified Gene as Saul Goodman from his time previously living in Albuquerque. (Note: As seen in "Smoke" and "Magic Man".) Jeff arrives home, recognizes Gene and questions his motives. Gene offers Jeff a chance to enter "the game" by burgling a department store in the shopping mall where Gene works as a manager of Cinnabon in exchange for Jeff's silence about Gene's true identity. Gene returns home, puts on the pinky ring he inherited from Marco Pasternak, (Note: As seen in Better Call Saul's "Marco" and throughout Breaking Bad.) and begins to prepare.

Over several days, Gene befriends mall security guard Frank by bringing him Cinnabon rolls and talking about Nebraska Cornhuskers football, tracking how long it takes for Frank to eat while sitting with his back to the security camera monitors. He then recreates the layout of the department store in a field and choreographs an efficient route and list of items for Jeff to maximize his takings. On the night of the burglary, he has Jeff's friend, Buddy, leave a box at the department store's loading dock under the guise of a mistaken delivery. Jeff is inside, and the box serves as a hiding place for the stolen merchandise. During the burglary Jeff slips and falls, knocking himself unconscious and disrupting the timing of the scheme. Gene feigns a depressive episode to divert Frank's attention. Jeff soon comes to, finishes placing stolen items in the box, hides in the bathroom, and leaves after the store opens in the morning.

As they revel in their success, Gene warns that if Jeff reveals Gene's true identity, Gene will report the burglary as a form of "mutual assured destruction", and makes Jeff promise never to cross paths with him again. Gene returns to work in a better mood than usual. On his lunch break, he admires a flamboyant Saul Goodman-type shirt in the department store, but leaves without purchasing it.

== Production ==
"Nippy" is the third episode directed by Michelle MacLaren in the Better Call Saul series, following "Mijo" in the first season and "Breathe" in the fourth season. It was written by executive producer Alison Tatlock.

Tatlock noted that designing an episode exclusively within Gene's timeline "just felt pleasing" for the creative team, and that it was intended to be a "surprising" and "perhaps maddening" decision to satisfy the audience. Tatlock explained that while the decision did not allow for linear coherence in the storytelling, it felt "organic" and that it was the right choice. Tatlock added that the team did not make long-term plans for the series, noting that it would subvert expectations to abruptly change direction. With regard to Gene placating Jeff, Tatlock said that she knew Gene would "empower himself and channel the moxie of Saul Goodman", and felt that the essence of Goodman's persona was resourceful and that he always exploited the situation to his advantage. Tatlock pointed to his diversionary tactic of staging a depressive episode during the store raid, observing that McGill had the ability to express particular emotions to achieve a goal during difficult moments while also expressing an underlying truth. MacLaren reiterated Tatlock's sentiments, believing that Gene's monologue articulated genuine emotions; Goodman's self-esteem was heavily eroded following his brother Chuck McGill's negative influence on his life; his values more closely aligned with self-sabotage.

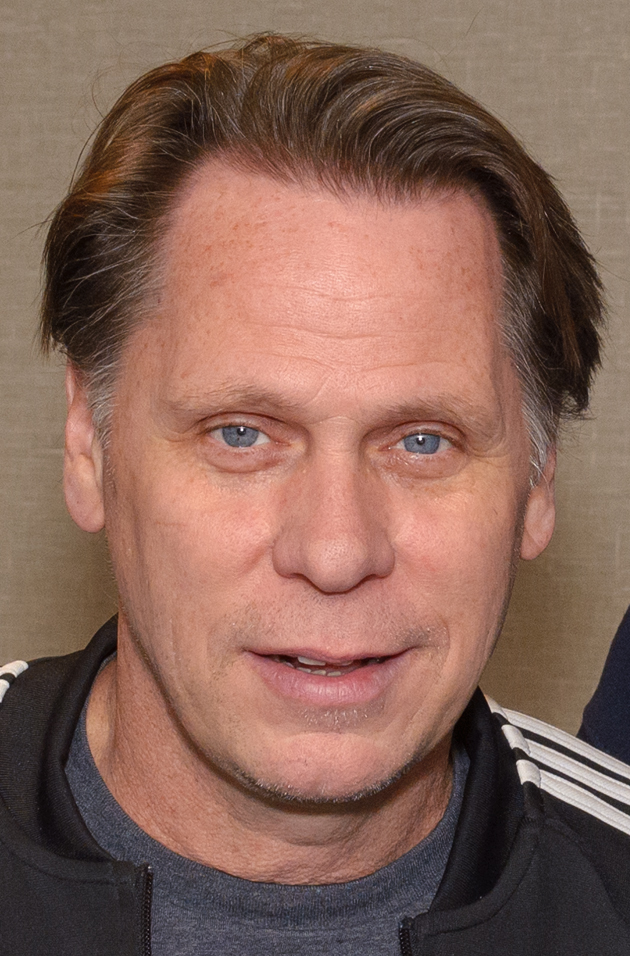
Harvey

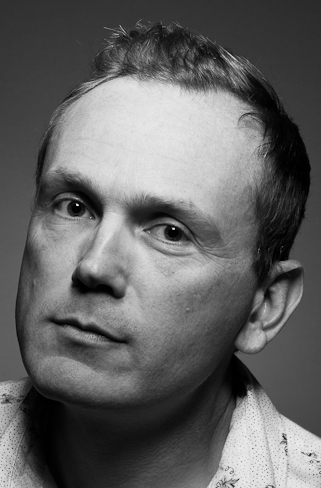
Healy

A work conflict made Don Harvey unavailable to return to the role of Jeff, a character he played for two seasons. He was replaced by Pat Healy.

The cab driver Jeff, previously portrayed by Don Harvey, was recast to Pat Healy due to a work conflict by Harvey. Healy originally auditioned for the role of Jeff during the production of the fourth season in March 2018, but was not hired. He was notified of Harvey's departure after he finished shooting his scenes for Martin Scorsese's Killers of the Flower Moon. Healy emphasized that the recast was not due to scheduling changes after Odenkirk's heart attack during "Point and Shoot", as he was cast before this incident. Harvey later expressed disappointment in not being able to reprise the role due to scheduling conflicts, but praised Healy for making the character his own. In the weeks prior to the airing of the episode, AMC released several teasers informing viewers of Jeff's recast. The promotional material featured clips of Healy in the role along with lines of Jeff's character from previous seasons that Healy re-recorded in a sound booth in Los Angeles.

Carol Burnett guest starred as Jeff's mother Marion. Burnett was a fan of both Breaking Bad and Better Call Saul, while the Better Call Saul staff were also fans of hers; the actress was mentioned by Chuck McGill during the second season episode "Rebecca". Series creator Vince Gilligan later stated that Burnett's arrival on the set raised the morale of the cast and crew, who had all grown exhausted from the season's extended production.

Though the story takes place in Omaha, Nebraska, the mall scenes were shot at the Cottonwood Mall in Albuquerque, New Mexico. The department store where the heist takes place was an empty space in the mall. The production designer and art department built the interior and every item in the store was created, purchased, or brought in. Actor Jim O'Heir had eaten numerous Cinnabon rolls while filming scenes as Frank. MacLaren intended for his scenes of eating the rolls to establish repetition, with his final bite inserted for tension, stating "as soon as that bite is in his mouth, you're done, if you're not done". O'Heir handed excess rolls to other cast members with forks or spit it out as they were difficult to digest due to their heaviness. Jeff's nervous exit from the store bathroom was the first scene that Healy filmed for the episode. In that scene, MacLaren directed Healy to "walk like you've got hemorrhoids". Healy said he had to run for ten hours while filming the heist scene, which was exhausting. MacLaren described the work as both complicated and joyous, praising Burnett for striking a balance between comedy and drama in her performance. She said of the heist scene, "when we were shooting it, I turned to everybody as I was practically falling out of my chair because I was laughing so hard".

"Nippy" marks several firsts for Better Call Saul. It is the first episode set entirely after Breaking Bad and the first to take place entirely in Gene's black-and-white timeline, an idea co-creator Peter Gould mentioned in February 2020. Gould also discussed his love of black-and-white films with the directors, focusing on how lighting affected the emotions. To reflect the differences of the two personas, cinematographer Paul Donachie deliberately created more shadows during Odenkirk's scenes as Saul Goodman and less shadows while he was portraying Gene Takavic. The episode is also the first in the sixth season to break with the "X and Y" naming scheme, and marked a change in the title credits. Traditionally, the title credits of each season's tenth episode featured Saul Goodman's "World's Greatest Lawyer" mug falling off his desk and shattering on the floor. However, in this episode, the title image prematurely stops and is replaced by a blue screen, recreating the style of a home video recording on a VCR. The score includes the music piece "Jim on the Move" by Lalo Schifrin, from the 1966 television series Mission: Impossible. Chris McCaleb and Joey Liew edited the episode.

== Reception ==
=== Critical response ===
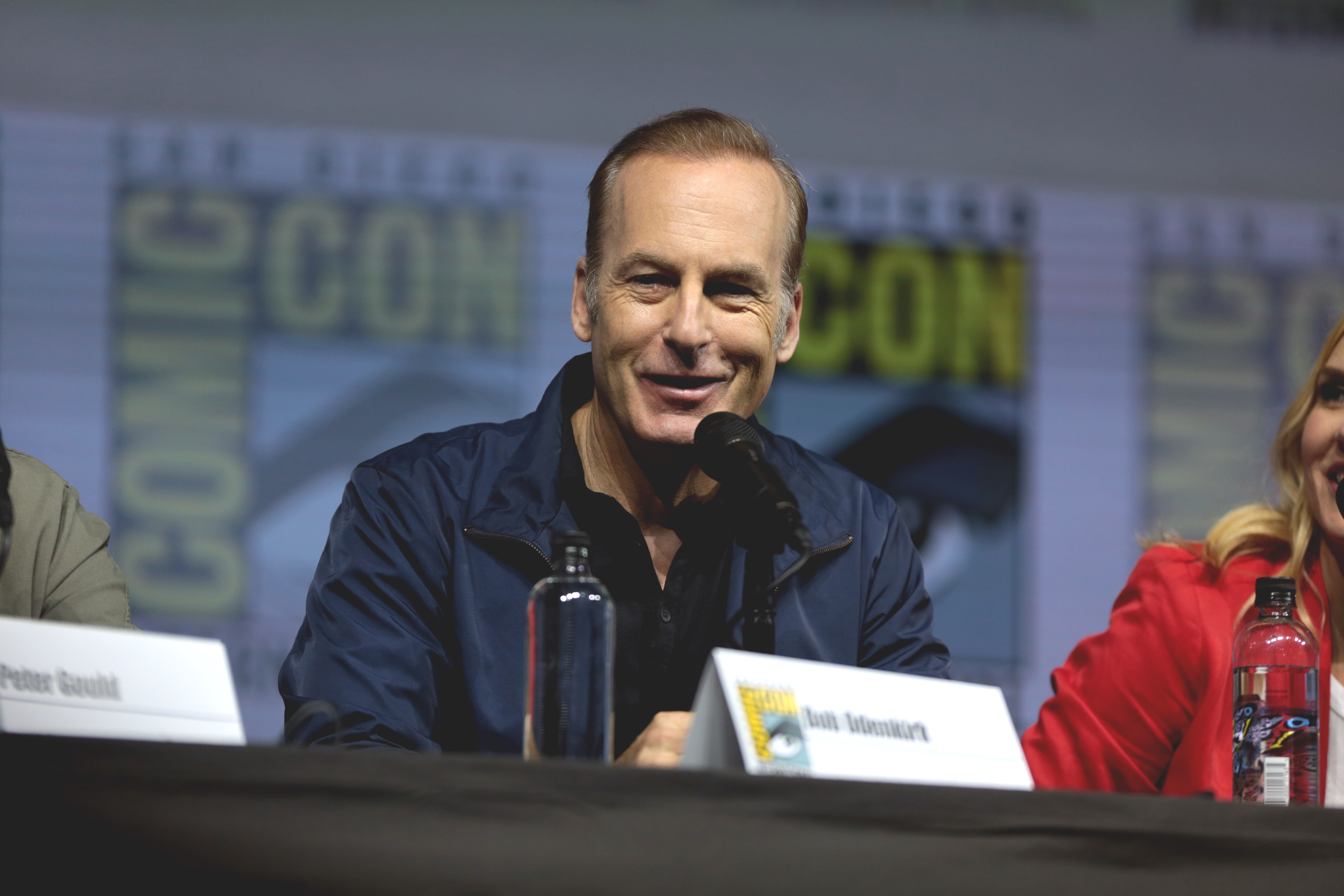
Bob Odenkirk is the only Better Call Saul regular to appear in "Nippy".

The episode received generally positive reviews. On the review aggregator Rotten Tomatoes, 90% of ten reviews are positive with an average rating of 9.5/10. Critics praised Tatlock's writing MacLaren's direction, while highlighting Odenkirk's performance during the scene in which he feigns a breakdown.

Alan Sepinwall of Rolling Stone described the episode as an unpredictable epilogue to Better Call Saul that "brings emotional color, thrills, and fun" and felt that it was narratively isolated from the core story of the series. Ashley Bissette Sumerel of Tell-Tale TV said she enjoyed the humor and watching the heist play out on screen, calling the tone "more somber" and giving it 4.5 stars out of 5. Scott Tobias of Vulture called it a "brilliant and wholly unexpected stand-alone episode" and gave it a 5 out of 5-star rating, enjoying the "homage" to All That Jazz (1979) and praising Burnett and Healy's performances. Vanity Fair's Mike Hogan labeled it a bottle episode that he believed would set the stage for the rest of the season. Steve Greene of IndieWire thought "Nippy" served as a "bitter hello to the future and the past" simultaneously, explaining that the episode revolved around Jimmy's existential crisis. He thought his conversation with Frank best exemplified this, as though it involved deceiving Frank, Jimmy was speaking based on his genuine personal experiences, and thus provided the episode with an A− rating.

David Segal of The New York Times did not like the episode. He experienced some confusion over the recasting of Jeff and said it "felt low-stakes and a bit broad". Meanwhile, Nick Harley's four out of five star rating and review for Den of Geek focused on the portrayal of Jimmy's internal conflict and how he struggles to inhibit his "Slippin' Jimmy" personality, citing Jimmy's commitment to performing the heist and his fascination to a colorful shirt during the heist, which he interpreted as being his innate desire to become Saul Goodman. He felt it was "a tribute to what Better Call Saul was at its best: a modestly scaled, yet rollicking look at a huckster in his element, fighting through feelings" but also opined that others could view the episode as being "polarizing". In an A rating, The A.V. Club's Kimbery Potts enjoyed MacLaren's direction of the heist, saying she "creates a cheeky caper vibe complete with split screens and Lalo Schifrin's "Jim On The Move" music from Mission: Impossible." She felt the pacing was deliberately abrupt to allow viewers to digest the prior violence and felt that Jeff had irrevocably "sparked the unleashing of the Saul Goodman-ness". Decider included "Nippy" in its list of "The Best TV Episodes of 2022".

=== Ratings ===
An estimated 1.20 million viewers watched "Nippy" during its first broadcast on AMC on July 25, 2022.
