= Fun and Games (Better Call Saul) =

- Better Call Saul episode
- Promotional poster
- Episode no.: Season 6 Episode 9
- Directed by: Michael Morris
- Written by: Ann Cherkis
- Cinematography by: Marshall Adams
- Editing by: Skip Macdonald
- Original air date: July 18, 2022
- Running time: 56 minutes

Guest appearances
- Ed Begley Jr. as Clifford Main; Steven Bauer as Don Eladio Vuente; Javier Grajeda as Juan Bolsa; Dennis Boutsikaris as Rich Schweikart; Luis Moncada as Marco Salamanca; Daniel Moncada as Leonel Salamanca; Sandrine Holt as Cheryl Hamlin; Reed Diamond as David; Tina Parker as Francesca Liddy; Juan Carlos Cantu as Manuel Varga; Arye Gross as Judge Gabriel Dearden; Peter Diseth as DDA Bill Oakley; Mark Margolis as Hector Salamanca

Episode chronology
← Previous "Point and Shoot"	Next → "Nippy"
- Better Call Saul season 6

"Fun and Games" is the ninth episode of the sixth season of Better Call Saul, the spin-off television series of Breaking Bad. It was directed by Michael Morris and written by Ann Cherkis. The episode aired on AMC and AMC+ on July 18, 2022, before debuting online in certain territories on Netflix the following day. In the episode, Gus Fring discusses the death of Lalo Salamanca with the cartel, Mike Ehrmantraut ties up a loose end, and Jimmy McGill and Kim Wexler deal with the aftermath of Howard Hamlin's murder.

"Fun and Games" was met with critical acclaim, particularly for its character development and the performances of Bob Odenkirk and Rhea Seehorn as Jimmy and Kim. It marks the final appearance for Giancarlo Esposito, who plays Fring. An estimated 1.22 million viewers saw the episode during its first broadcast on AMC.

== Plot ==
Jimmy McGill and Kim Wexler leave for work while Mike Ehrmantraut and his men remove traces of Howard Hamlin's murder (Note: As seen in "Plan and Execution".) from their apartment. When they return, Jimmy reassures Kim that they will eventually forget what happened, (Note: Repeating what Mike said to him in the episode "Bad Choice Road".) but Kim does not react.

Gus Fring meets with members of the cartel at Don Eladio's home. Juan Bolsa reads Hector Salamanca's statement claiming Lalo Salamanca survived the shootout at his house which Gus organized, but has since been killed for real. With no proof of Lalo's initial survival, Eladio dismisses Hector's accusations. To keep the peace, Eladio divides the Albuquerque-area drug territory: the Salamancas will control the South Valley, while Gus receives the area to the north. Upon his return, Gus tells Mike to find a new crew to resume construction of the meth lab. To celebrate, Gus visits a wine bar and enjoys the company of David, his favorite sommelier, before cutting the visit short. At night, Mike visits Nacho Varga's father, Manuel, who recognizes Mike from having previously worked on his Chrysler Fifth Avenue. (Note: As seen in "Cobbler".) Mike informs Manuel of Nacho's death, (Note: As seen in "Rock and Hard Place".) says the Salamancas will no longer target him, and that they will face "justice". Manuel dismissively tells Mike he is no different from the other criminals with whom he associates.

Jimmy and Kim attend Howard's memorial at HHM and learn the firm will downsize and rebrand. Howard's widow, Cheryl, questions them about the circumstances of Howard's death. Kim deflects blame by suggesting Cheryl failed to notice Howard's supposed drug problem, causing Cheryl to break down in tears. The next morning, Kim surrenders her law license. When Jimmy returns home, he begs Kim to reconsider but finds she has packed her belongings. Kim tells Jimmy she loves him but they are bad for each other and will only hurt those around them. She reveals she knew of Lalo's survival before he appeared at their apartment but did not tell Jimmy for fear it would jeopardize their scheme against Howard, which she enjoyed but now regrets. Kim then tearfully leaves Jimmy.

In a flashforward, Jimmy has fully embraced his Saul Goodman persona, living in a large mansion, frequenting prostitutes, and driving a 1997 Cadillac DeVille with a "LWYRUP" vanity plate to his newly renovated office to meet with clients. (Note: Saul's office is decorated as seen in Breaking Bad.)

== Production ==
"Fun and Games" was written and directed by Better Call Saul veterans Ann Cherkis and Michael Morris, respectively. The episode was dedicated to Julia Clark Downs, an Albuquerque attorney who consulted for the show in regard to its legal system presentations. Downs died on October 5, 2021, in a traffic accident.

The episode marked the end of the drug cartel storyline on Better Call Saul. Giancarlo Esposito made his final appearance as Gus Fring, while Jonathan Banks made only two more brief appearances as Mike Ehrmantraut. The opening montage in the episode was 12 to 16 pages in Cherkis's script. The concept of directing a montage was not new to Morris, as he had worked on one for the season four episode "Quite a Ride". He said testing the props for the opening scene took a lot of time and precision. A music cover of Harry Nilsson's "Perfect Day", by Dresage and Slow Shiver, was recorded for the intro to accommodate the runtime. For the scene between Mike and Manuel, a fence was put in to symbolize imprisonment. Esposito and Reed Diamond, who played David, previously worked together on the television film Homicide: The Movie (2000). Most of the images used during Howard Hamlin's memorial were taken from actor Patrick Fabian's personal social media, slightly edited to avoid anachronisms; only one image was newly shot for the episode.

The breakup scene was rehearsed to plan how the crew would shoot the scene with Morris, cinematographer Marshall Adams, camera operators Matt Credle and Jordan Slovin, and dolly grip Eli Schneider in the same room. Rhea Seehorn, who plays Kim, described it as an intimate, orchestrated dance to shoot the scene with a minimal number of cuts. Morris mentioned that they "covered essentially each side of the whole conversation moving from room to room in a single take, and we did not use a hand-held camera, which just means we had to build a very, very precise dolly track and a sound plan to get it covered, and the set wasn't really built for that kind of thing. It was a huge effort from everyone to cover the scene that way, but I wanted to do it because having rehearsed it with them, I knew that this was not a scene that you wanted to break up ... because they were so on top of the moment and we would have lost so much. The rehearsal was huge for us."

Morris said they filmed the transition to the final scene's flashforward in an "unconventional way" by not focusing on having the last shot of the Better Call Saul timeline be Jimmy's facial reaction, but rather his point of view of the "last time he's going to see this apartment probably in some real sense". He would explain that the transition continued by cutting to the future where "it's not him anymore. That was how we approached that. We shot each side of this in one unbroken take from room to room and pulling back. That's why the camera moves more than the camera often moves in a scene like this in Better Call Saul. Rather than try and maintain an emotional peak on [his] face, I'd rather just be in the room with him and just let it die." Executive producer and staff writer Thomas Schnauz compared the sudden transition from the worlds of Jimmy McGill to Saul Goodman to the scene in 2001: A Space Odyssey (1968) where the caveman throws the bone in the air and it quickly cuts to a spaceship.

There is some ambiguity surrounding the length of the time skip at the end of the episode. While the dates on Saul's license plate and handicapped placard may indicate the final scenes take place around 2005, Better Call Saul executive producer Thomas Schnauz stated that the events may take place closer to 2007. However, Schnauz later clarified that it could indeed be 2005, as he was not aware of the dates shown, though his estimation was based on the discussions from the writers' room. He explained that, "Ultimately, it doesn't matter what year [the episode] ends in. He's full Saul Goodman, prior to the events of [Breaking Bad]."

== Reception ==
=== Critical response ===
"Fun and Games" was met with critical acclaim. On the review aggregator Rotten Tomatoes, all of its nine reviews are positive, with an average rating of 9.5/10. The episode received five out of five stars from Vulture's Scott Tobias, four and a half out of five stars from Nick Harley of Den of Geek, and "A−" grades from The A.V. Club's Kimberly Potts and IndieWire's Steve Greene. Greene said the episode offered a "dose of the beautifully crafted anguish that this show has perfected. It's an hour of faces of people forced to reckon with what's now broken in their own lives, whether or not they fully blame themselves for doing the actual breaking." Entertainment Weekly and Rolling Stone included "Fun and Games" on their lists for the best TV episodes of 2022. In 2024, Rolling Stone listed it as the 18th best TV episode of all time.

The scene between Gus and David was analyzed by several critics, who concluded Gus was unwilling to start a relationship because he did not want to risk putting a loved one in danger. Harley said it was the first scene to challenge his perception of Gus, and wished the show had explored more of the character's thoughts and emotions before its end. Greene lauded the scene's direction and wrote, "It's a kind of genuine, uncalculated kind of interaction that Gus is rarely afforded (or that he rarely affords himself)." Alan Sepinwall of Rolling Stone described it as "remarkable", "lovely", and "terribly sad" and praised Esposito's performance as Gus. Sepinwall also said the scene between Gus and the cartel was tense because it felt like the end of their stories on Better Call Saul. The scene between Mike and Manuel was also well received. Tobias called it "extraordinary" and said Manuel's description of Mike was a reminder to the audience of Mike's true nature as a fixer: "He's so fully immersed in this cutthroat world of exploitation and death that he's lost touch with how ordinary people process loss or seek justice. His goodness is only relative to the vipers in his sphere." Harley complimented it and said it was "the sort of hardboiled, dark night of the soul stuff that Mike's storylines so frequently produce, and it's as excellent and heartbreaking as the rest".

The character development of Jimmy into the person he was in Breaking Bad received praise. Tobias said the transition from Kim's departure to Jimmy's new life was "brilliant": "We don't need to fill in the steps that got Jimmy from here to there because Jimmy McGill moved out right along with Kim. He's Saul Goodman 24/7 now." Greene wrote of the character, "There's an ever-so-thin line separating what Jimmy knows to be true and wants to be true. 'Fun and Games' is filled with the latter, tiny statements that you can almost see him trying to will into fact. Everything you need to fill in that episode-ending time jump ... is in seeing Jimmy plead for one last chance to make things right. And then failing."

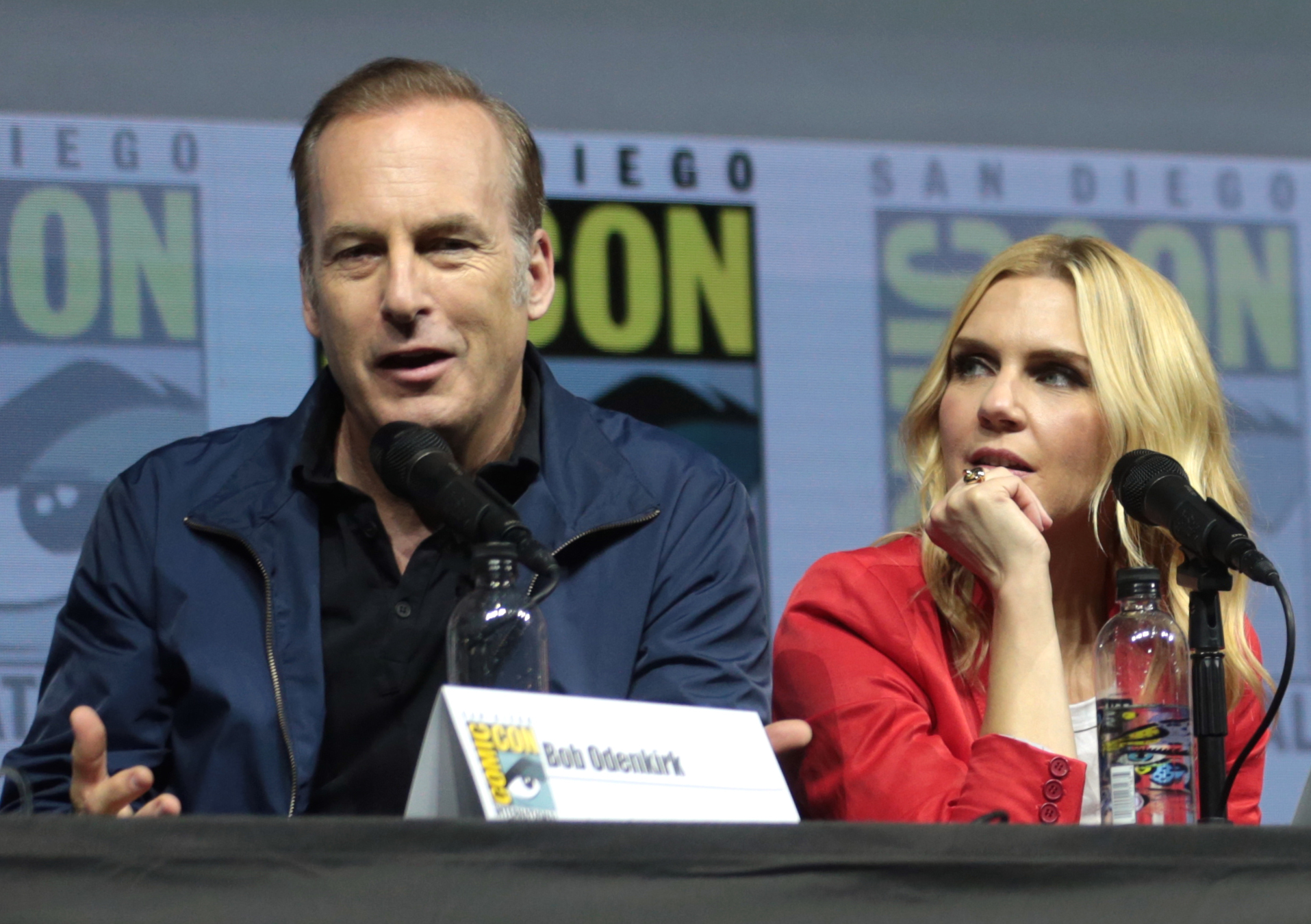
The performances of Bob Odenkirk and Rhea Seehorn were praised by critics.

The performances of Bob Odenkirk and Rhea Seehorn as Jimmy and Kim were praised by critics. Sepinwall called it an "absolute acting marvel" from the two actors. Michael Hogan of Vanity Fair said there was "so much amazing acting and dialogue" in the breakup scene that "you have to just sort of stand back and behold the pièce de résistance". Tobias said Seehorn "nailed the moment as usual". Harley thought the departure felt right for a series like Better Call Saul and said the two actors were "extraordinary": "You can almost physically see Jimmy trying to hold on as Kim pulls away from him. It feels honest, like a real breakup, and not too histrionic or staged." Harley predicted Kim would return, saying it was not a "proper goodbye" to the character. Potts felt the breakup "moved too quickly" but nevertheless gave the episode a positive review, noting how Odenkirk and Seehorn "display frighteningly real sincerity". TVLine named Seehorn the performer of the week ending on July 23, 2022: "Seehorn was masterful — and heartbreaking ... It was a stunning exit, and one we really hope isn't the last we see of Kim Wexler. We just enjoy watching Rhea Seehorn too much for that."

=== Ratings ===
An estimated 1.22 million viewers watched "Fun and Games" during its first broadcast on AMC on July 18, 2022.
