= Better Call Saul season 6 =

Sixth season of the AMC crime drama television series

Better Call Saul
- Season 6
- Home media cover art
- Showrunner: Peter Gould
- Starring: Bob Odenkirk; Jonathan Banks; Rhea Seehorn; Patrick Fabian; Michael Mando; Tony Dalton; Giancarlo Esposito
- No. of episodes: 13

Release
- Original network: AMC
- Original release: April 18 – August 15, 2022

Season chronology
- ← Previous; Season 5

The sixth and final season of the AMC television series Better Call Saul premiered on April 18, 2022, in the United States, and concluded on August 15, 2022. The thirteen-episode season was broadcast on Mondays at 9:00 pm (Eastern) in the United States on AMC and its streaming service AMC+. Each episode was released on Netflix the day after in certain international markets. The season was split into two parts; the first consisting of the first seven episodes concluded on May 23, before resuming with the second half consisting of the final six episodes on July 11. Bob Odenkirk, Jonathan Banks, Rhea Seehorn, Patrick Fabian, Michael Mando, Tony Dalton, and Giancarlo Esposito reprise their roles from previous seasons. Better Call Saul is a spinoff, prequel and sequel of Breaking Bad created by Vince Gilligan and Peter Gould.

The first nine episodes mainly take place in Albuquerque, New Mexico in 2004, four years before Jimmy McGill (Odenkirk) begins his association with meth cooks Walter White (Bryan Cranston) and Jesse Pinkman (Aaron Paul). The season shows the further evolution of Jimmy into the eponymous character, criminal defense lawyer "Saul Goodman", as he and his wife Kim Wexler (Seehorn) execute their plan to force a resolution of the Sandpiper case by ruining the career of Howard Hamlin (Fabian). Simultaneously, it depicts Lalo Salamanca (Dalton) seeking revenge on Gus Fring (Esposito) for orchestrating an assassination attempt on him. The remaining episodes mainly take place in 2010, after the events of Breaking Bad, and show Saul living in Omaha, Nebraska under the alias "Gene Takavic", hiding from the authorities after Walter's demise.

The sixth season was filmed in Albuquerque over a period of eleven months. The production experienced significant delays due to the COVID-19 pandemic; further delays ensued after Odenkirk suffered a heart attack while filming "Point and Shoot". It was near-unanimously acclaimed by critics, particularly for its performances, writing, visuals, emotional weight, and similarity to Breaking Bad. The first half received four nominations at the 74th Primetime Emmy Awards, including Outstanding Drama Series. The second half received five nominations for the 75th Primetime Emmy Awards, including Outstanding Drama Series, Odenkirk's sixth nomination for Outstanding Lead Actor in a Drama Series and Seehorn's second nomination for Outstanding Supporting Actress in a Drama Series.

== Cast and characters ==
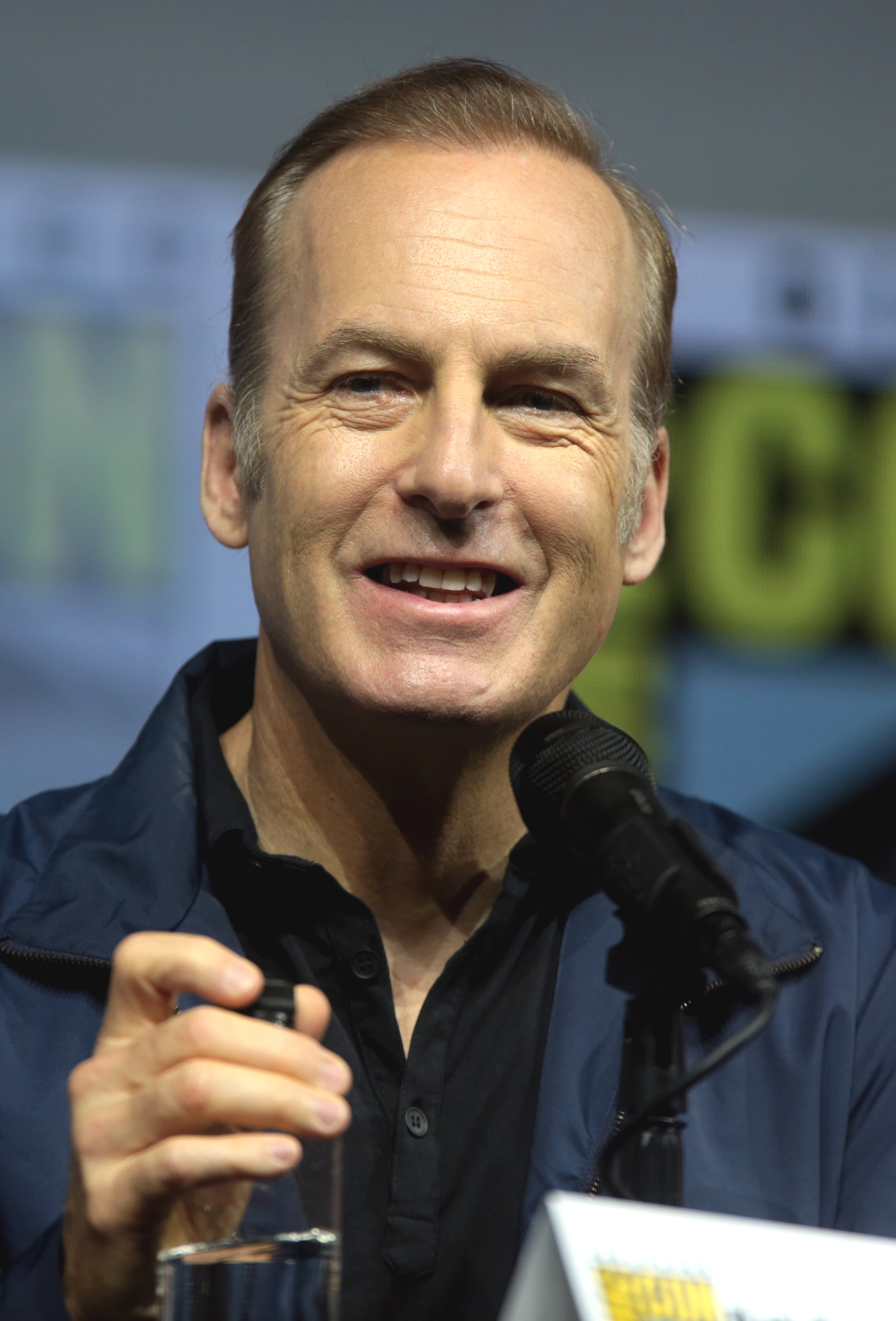
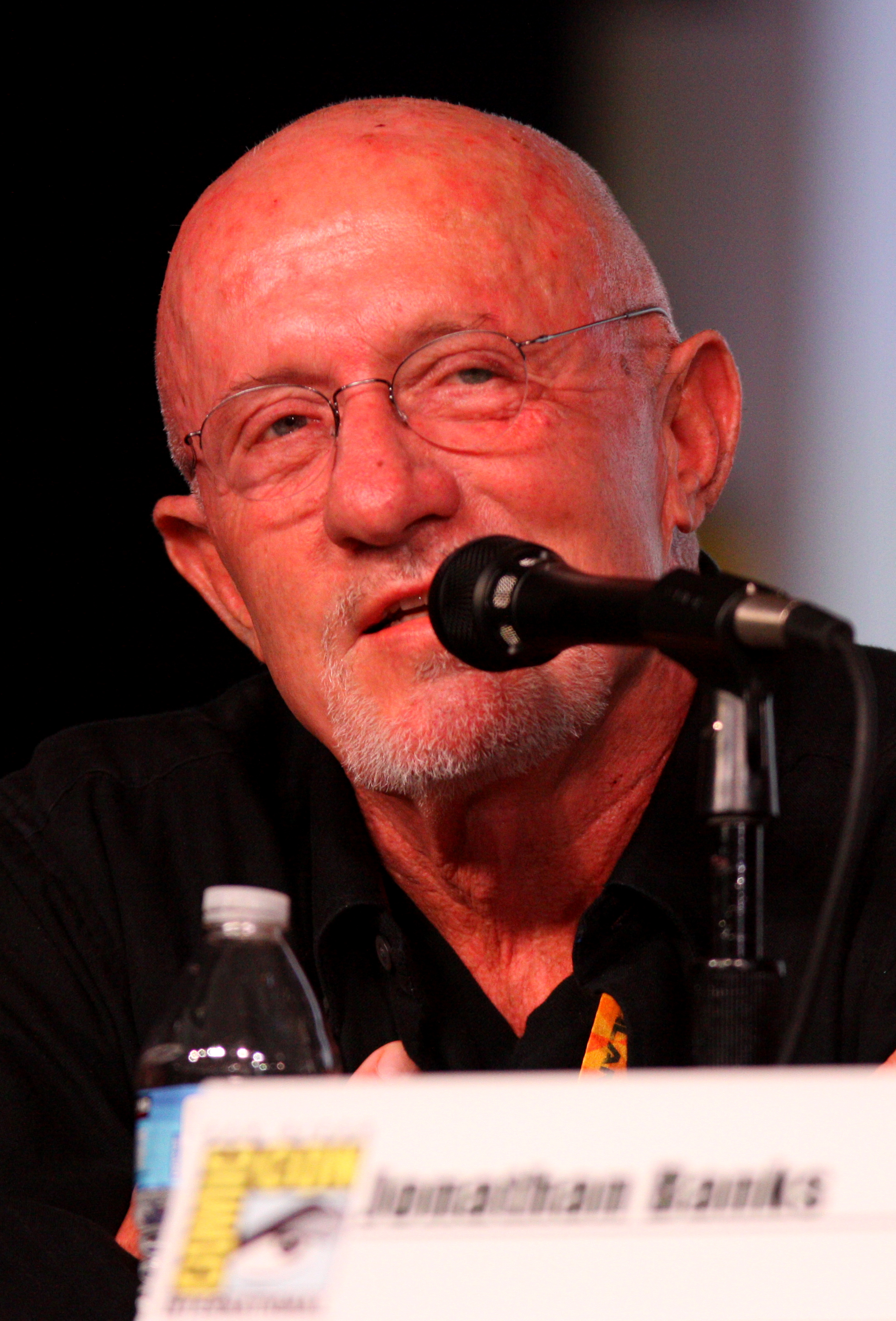
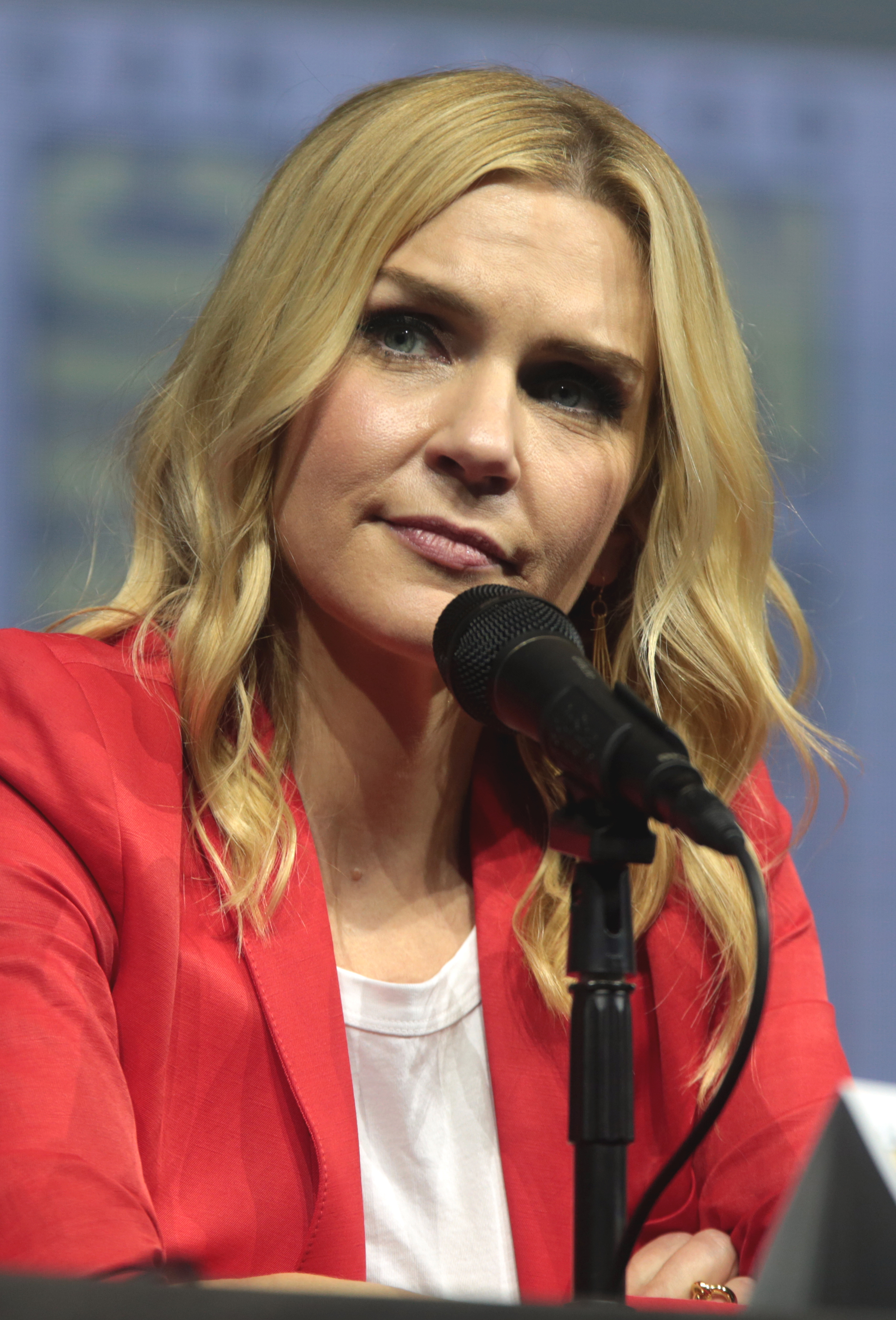
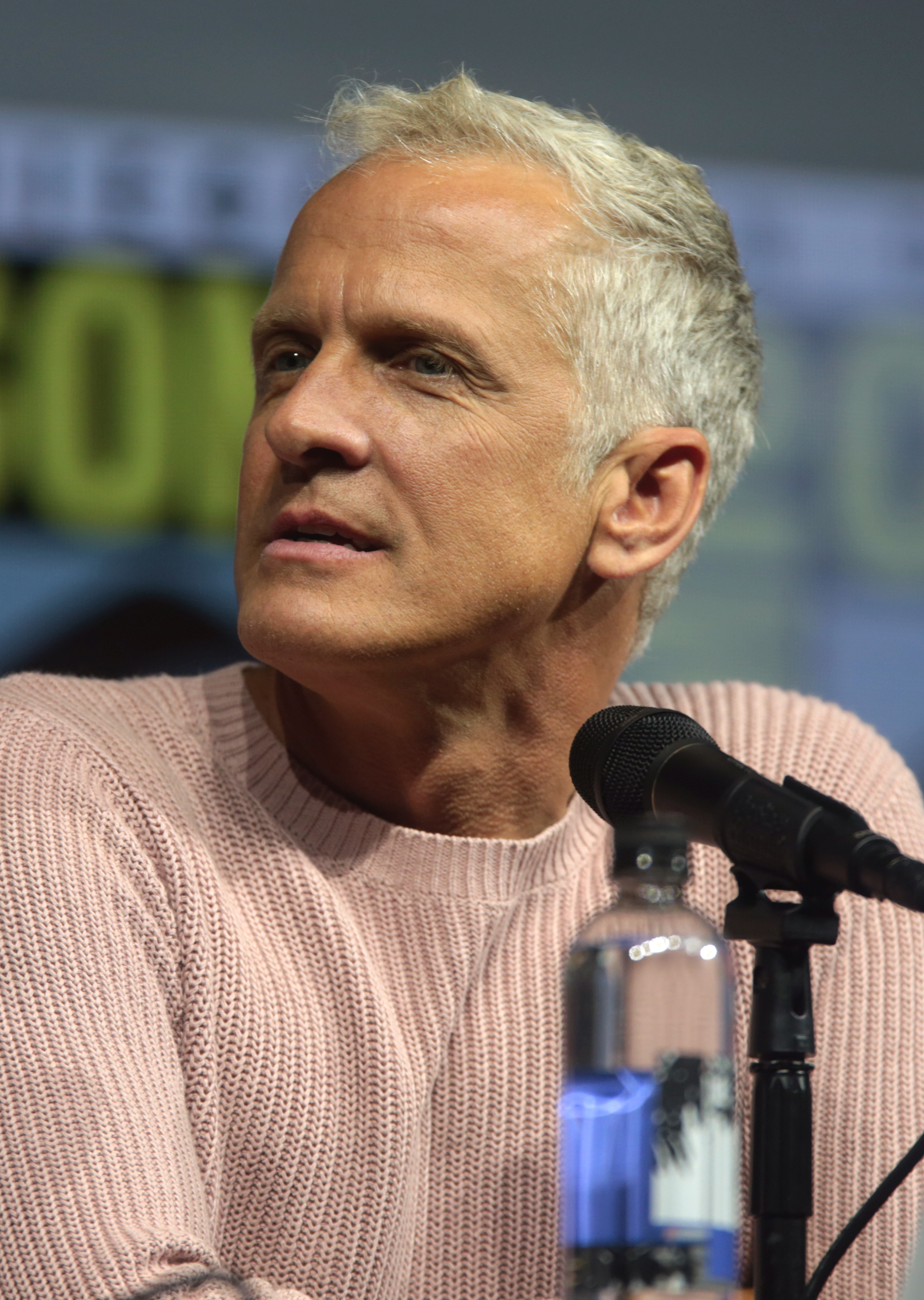
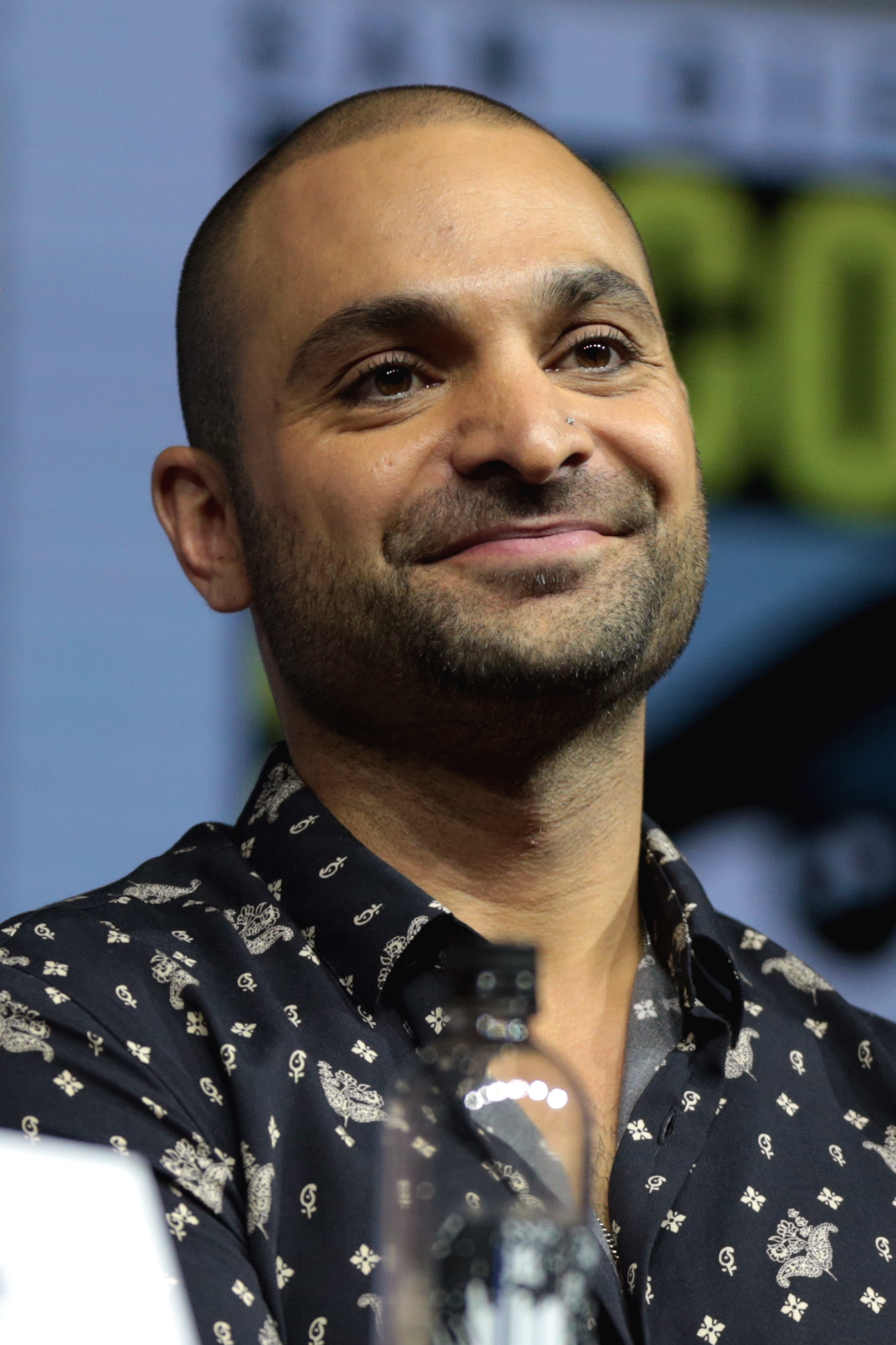
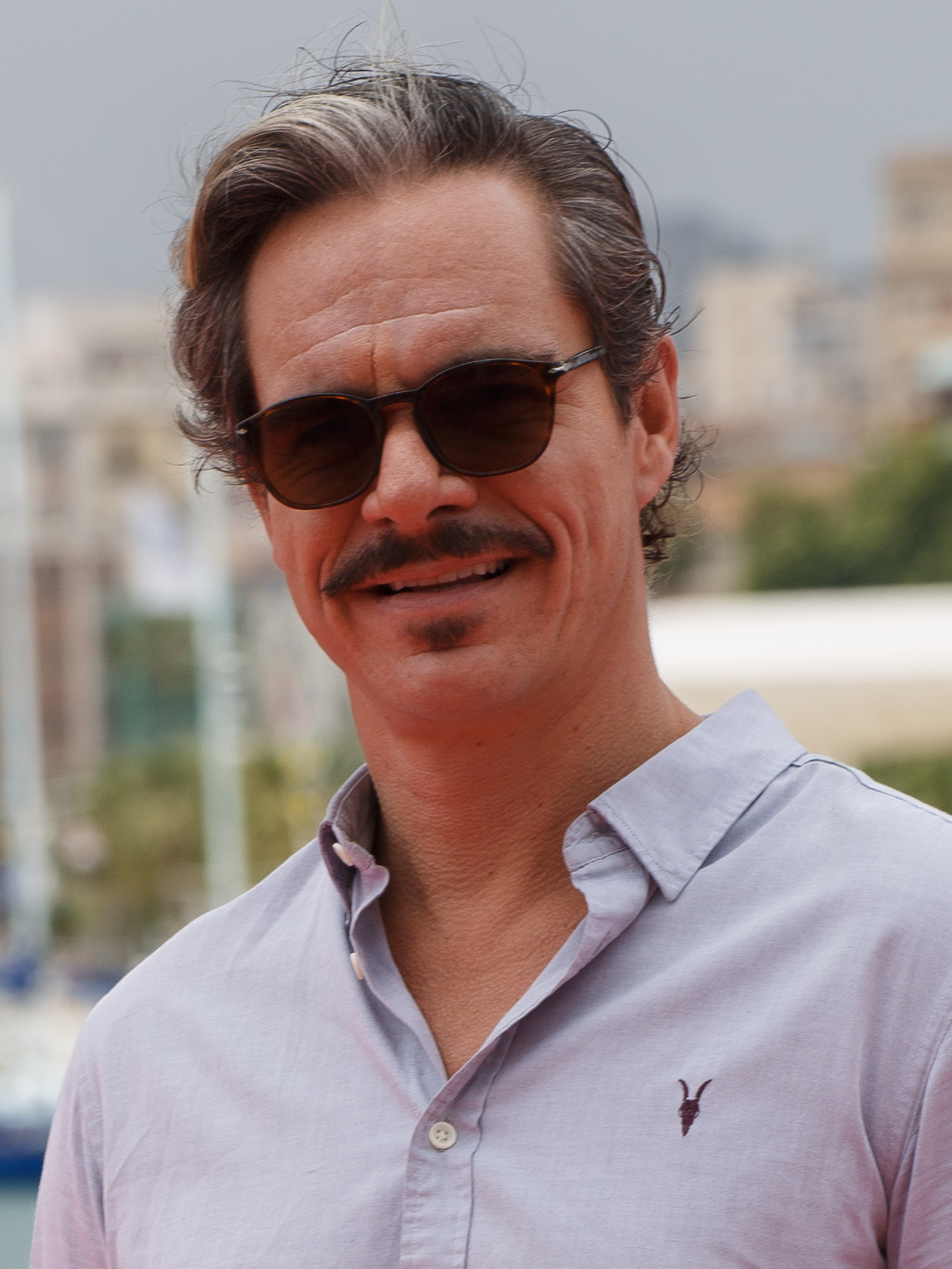
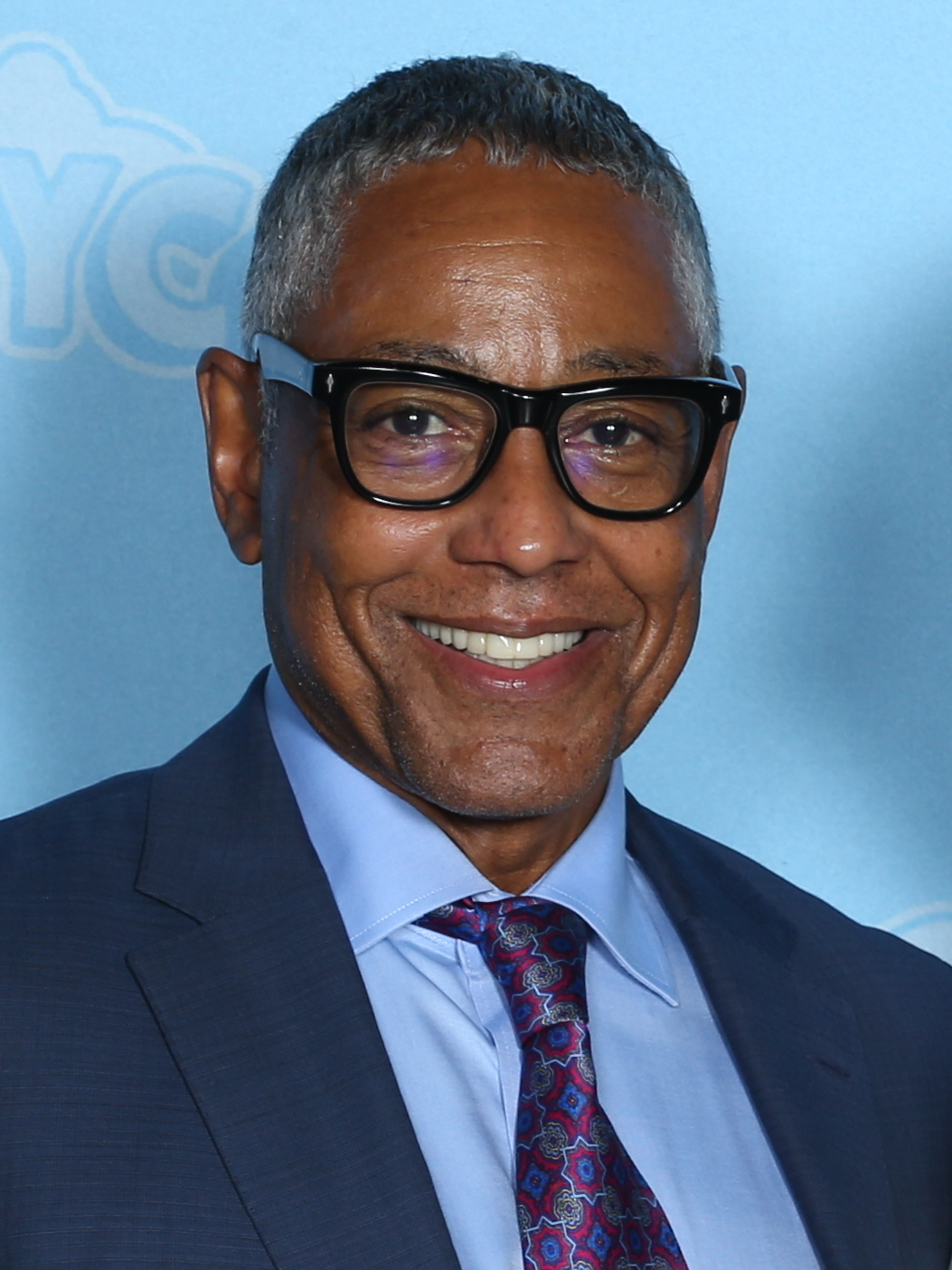
The sixth season stars Bob Odenkirk (Jimmy McGill / Saul Goodman), Jonathan Banks (Mike Ehrmantraut), Rhea Seehorn (Kim Wexler), Patrick Fabian (Howard Hamlin), Michael Mando (Nacho Varga), Tony Dalton (Lalo Salamanca), and Giancarlo Esposito (Gus Fring).

=== Main ===
- Bob Odenkirk as Jimmy McGill / Saul Goodman, a criminal defense attorney practicing under the name Saul Goodman. In the post-Breaking Bad timeline, he manages a Cinnabon store in Omaha under the alias Gene Takavic.
- Jonathan Banks as Mike Ehrmantraut, a fixer in Gus Fring's criminal enterprise who is hunting down Lalo after Gus's attempted assassination failed.
- Rhea Seehorn as Kim Wexler, a lawyer and Jimmy's wife and confidante.
- Patrick Fabian as Howard Hamlin, managing partner of the Hamlin, Hamlin & McGill law firm.
- Michael Mando as Nacho Varga, a Salamanca lieutenant who oversees daily operations in Albuquerque and Gus's unwilling mole within the Salamanca organization.
- Tony Dalton as Lalo Salamanca, acting head of the Salamancas, a family of drug dealers and enforcers for Don Eladio's cartel. He surveils Gus to learn the secret of Gus's planned underground meth lab. To keep the secret, Gus orchestrates an assassination attempt.
- Giancarlo Esposito as Gus Fring, an Albuquerque narcotics distributor for Eladio's cartel who uses his fried chicken chain Los Pollos Hermanos as a front.

=== Recurring ===
- Ed Begley Jr. as Clifford Main, founding partner of Davis & Main Attorneys at Law, who is working with Howard on the Sandpiper case.
- Mark Margolis as Hector Salamanca, a once-brutal drug dealer and cartel enforcer who suffered a stroke and is unable to walk or speak.
- Daniel and Luis Moncada as Leonel and Marco Salamanca, twin hitmen for the Juárez Cartel and nephews of Hector.
- Ray Campbell as Tyrus Kitt, one of Gus's henchmen.
- Javier Grajeda as Juan Bolsa, a Juárez drug cartel underboss.
- Jeremiah Bitsui as Victor, one of Gus's henchmen.
- Juan Carlos Cantu as Manuel Varga, Nacho's father, who owns an upholstery shop.
- Peter Diseth as Bill Oakley, a deputy district attorney.
- Harrison Thomas as Lyle, the assistant manager of the Los Pollos Hermanos branch in Albuquerque.
- Jessie Ennis as Erin Brill, a lawyer at Davis & Main.
- Tina Parker as Francesca Liddy, Saul's secretary.
- Lennie Loftin as Genidowski, a con man hired by Jimmy and Kim to pose as Howard's private investigator.
- Josh Fadem as Joey Dixon/Marshall, a UNM film teacher who helps Jimmy on various projects and schemes.
- Hayley Holmes as Make-up Girl/Drama Girl/Cheri, a UNM film student.
- Julian Bonfiglio as Sound Guy/Phil, a UNM film student.
- Sandrine Holt as Cheryl Hamlin, Howard's estranged wife.
- John Posey as Rand Casimiro, a retired judge who is mediating the Sandpiper case.
- John Ennis as Lenny, a grocery store employee hired by Jimmy and Kim to impersonate Casimiro.
- Dennis Boutsikaris as Rich Schweikart, founding partner of the Scweikart and Cokely law firm.
- Bryan Cranston as Walter White, a middle-aged high school chemistry teacher who, during the events of Breaking Bad, becomes involved with the drug trade and enlists Saul to help launder his money, appears in flashbacks.
- Aaron Paul as Jesse Pinkman, a former student of Walter's who, during the events of Breaking Bad, works with him to produce and sell meth, appears in flashbacks.
- Pat Healy as Jeff, a cab driver who recognizes Gene as Saul Goodman. Healy replaced Don Harvey, who was unable to reprise his role due to another filming commitment.
- Max Bickelhaup as Buddy, Jeff's friend and partner in crime.
- Carol Burnett as Marion, Jeff's mother who takes a liking to Gene.

=== Guests ===
- Julie Ann Emery and Jeremy Shamos as Betsy and Craig Kettleman, a married couple whom Jimmy, and later Kim, represented during an embezzlement case, and who attempted to extort Jimmy. Since Craig's release from prison they have operated a shady tax preparation service.
- Rex Linn as Kevin Wachtell, CEO of Mesa Verde Bank & Trust.
- Lavell Crawford as Huell Babineaux, professional pickpocket and Jimmy's bodyguard and fixer.
- Julie Pearl as Suzanne Ericsen, an assistant district attorney.
- Eileen Fogarty as Mrs. Nguyen, owner of a nail salon that houses Jimmy's law office in its utility room.
- Julia Minesci as Wendy, a street prostitute working out of the Crossroads motel, reprising her role from Breaking Bad.
- David Ury as Spooge, a small-time criminal, reprising his role from Breaking Bad.
- Keiko Agena as Viola Goto, Kim Wexler's former paralegal.
- Andrea Sooch as Margarethe Ziegler, Werner Ziegler's widow.
- Kerry Condon as Stacey Ehrmantraut, Mike's widowed daughter-in-law and the mother of Kaylee Ehrmantraut.
- Joe DeRosa as Dr. Caldera, a veterinarian who serves as Mike and Jimmy's liaison to the criminal underworld.
- Stefan Kapičić as Casper, a member of Werner's construction crew.
- Kirk Bovill as Mr. Ryman, a seemingly innocent suburbanite who works for Gus Fring.
- Joni Bovill as Mrs. Ryman, a seemingly innocent suburbanite who works for Gus Fring.
- Jean Effron as Irene Landry, Jimmy's former elder law client who represents the class in the Sandpiper lawsuit.
- Steven Bauer as Don Eladio Vuente, head of the cartel.
- Reed Diamond as David, a sommelier at a prestigious restaurant and Fring's frequent confidante.
- Jim O'Heir as Frank, a security guard at Cottonwood Mall whom Gene befriends.
- Devin Ratray as Alfred Hawthorne Hill, a boorish man who falls victim to Gene's identity theft scam.
- Kevin Sussman as Mr. Lingk, a man with cancer who is targeted for a scam by Gene.
- John Koyama as Emilio Koyama, Jesse's future partner in the drug business during the events of Breaking Bad.
- Betsy Brandt as Marie Schrader, Hank Schrader's widow. She appears as a witness against Saul Goodman when he is finally arrested and attends Saul's trial.
- Michael McKean as Chuck McGill, Jimmy's deceased brother and partner at Hamlin, Hamlin & McGill, appears in a flashback.
- Poppy Liu as Jo, a prostitute living with Nacho.

== Production ==
=== Development ===
In January 2020, AMC renewed Better Call Saul for a sixth and final season. Showrunner Peter Gould and AMC representatives confirmed it would consist of 13 episodes, higher than the usual 10. This brought the series' total episode count to 63, one more than its predecessor Breaking Bad. Gould stated, "From the beginning when we started this, I think all our hopes and dreams were to be able to tell the whole story ... and make it to be a complete story from beginning to end ... We're going to try like hell to stick the landing of these 63 episodes." Giancarlo Esposito had previously speculated in April 2019 that the series would end with a sixth season because it was the "comfortable way" to do so, similar to how Breaking Bad's fifth and final season was split into two halves, giving the feeling that the latter half was the sixth season. Gould said he initially doubted how he could do 13 episodes because the 10-episode count of previous seasons proved physically exhausting for him, but executive producer and writer Thomas Schnauz convinced him to go for 13, saying, "You'll know it's the last 13 so you'll see the barn in the distance. You'll be like the horse that gallops down the last bit."

=== Writing ===
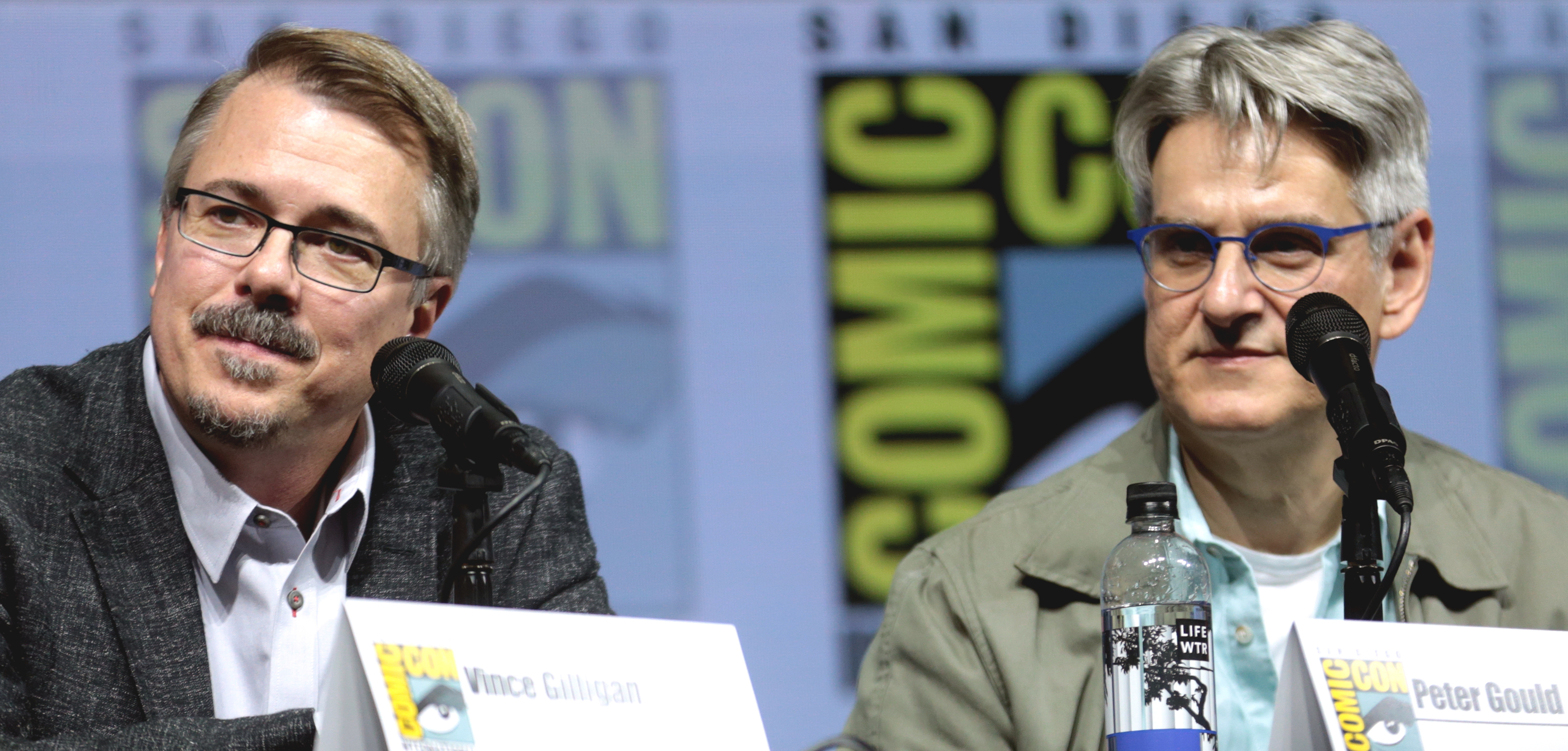
Co-creators Vince Gilligan and Peter Gould. Gilligan had left the writers' room during the third season but returned for the sixth.

In February 2020, Gould suggested the sixth season would explore Saul Goodman's flashforwards as Gene Takavic to a greater extent than previous seasons. Gould later said the season would explore if there was any way for Saul to earn redemption after his criminal activities throughout the series. During filming of the season, series star Bob Odenkirk said that Gould told him that "when Better Call Saul is done it will shed new light ... you will see Breaking Bad and the story of Breaking Bad in a different way", comparing to its final season where Gilligan had "start[ed] knocking things down and start[ed] lighting fires and burning everything down".

To deliver a satisfactory conclusion to Better Call Saul, Gould brought co-creator Vince Gilligan back to the writer's room "for a good chunk of the season". Gilligan had not been involved in the writers' room since early in season three. By April 2020, scripting for the season had already begun. Due to the COVID-19 pandemic, the writing staff was forced to communicate through Zoom rather than in person. By December 2020, scripting was still not complete; Gould would compare the writers room communicating through Zoom to "trying to dance in quick sand".

=== Casting ===
Laura Fraser confirmed weeks after the premiere date's announcement that she was unable to reprise her role as Lydia Rodarte-Quayle for the final season. This was due to COVID-19 restrictions preventing travel between the United States and Scotland, where she lived when the final season began filming. Prior to the season premiere, it was announced that Bryan Cranston and Aaron Paul would reprise their roles from Breaking Bad for the final season as Walter White and Jesse Pinkman, respectively.

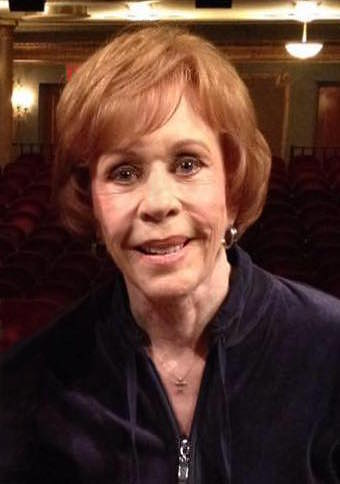
A noted fan of the series, Carol Burnett portrays Marion during the Gene timeline beginning with the episode "Nippy".

During the mid-season break, it was announced that the latter half of the season would feature Carol Burnett in the role of Marion, although details about the character were not disclosed. Burnett was previously mentioned by Chuck McGill during the second season episode "Rebecca". It was also revealed that the character of Jeff, the cab driver who recognized Saul in Omaha, had been recast from Don Harvey to Pat Healy. Fans theorized this was due to Harvey's filming commitments on We Own This City. Harvey later expressed disappointment in not being able to reprise the role due to scheduling conflicts, but praised Healy for making the character his own.

=== Filming ===
==== COVID-19 delays ====
In April 2020, Michael Mando and Tony Dalton separately said filming was scheduled to begin that September, but both were unsure if it would be delayed due to the pandemic. Rhea Seehorn said in July that filming would not begin until it was safe to do so. In August, producer Mark Johnson said the pandemic could limit where the series filmed by eschewing specific indoor locations: "Like a lot of other people, we're going to have to be very creative in where and how we shoot [...] A lot of places just won't let you in [...] We don't want everything to be a chamber piece". In the same month, Gould said filming was unlikely to start in 2020 due to the pandemic, adding that while Sony Pictures Television was doing "everything humanly" possible for the series to resume filming safely, "I think we are probably going to delay a little bit unfortunately." In October, Esposito said filming would begin in March 2021, which was echoed by Odenkirk in February 2021.

Filming officially began on March 10, 2021, in New Mexico. Each episode was expected to take about three weeks to film, a longer filming schedule compared to previous seasons, where a typical episode was filmed in nine days. Production was predicted to last roughly eight months, but filming instead wrapped after eleven months on February 9, 2022. Additional filming was done in March 2022, after principal photography for the series ended, for the opening teaser of "Point and Shoot". With several crew members but no cast members on hand, the scene was filmed in Leo Carrillo State Beach, California. This was the only time the series was filmed outside of New Mexico.

For the first time in the series, production allowed cast members to serve as directors, with Seehorn and Esposito each directing an episode. Cranston and Paul would appear in one scene together as well as one individual scene each. Their roles were kept in absolute secrecy, with both actors kept out of sight when not on set, similar to when filming Cranston's cameo for El Camino: A Breaking Bad Movie. Both actors were flown in to Albuquerque in April 2021 and stayed for four days at an Airbnb, with all wardrobe and makeup done in the home and only leaving to be taken on site to shoot.

==== Odenkirk's on-set heart attack ====
We were shooting a scene, we'd been shooting all day, and luckily I didn't go back to my trailer. I went to play the Cubs game and ride my workout bike, and I just went down. Rhea said I started turning bluish-gray right away.

— Bob Odenkirk

On July 27, 2021, after filming a "Point and Shoot" scene for twelve hours, Odenkirk was riding his exercise bike when he suffered a heart attack. Seehorn, Fabian, and Dalton were nearby and immediately called for help upon seeing him collapse. The show's health safety supervisor Rosa Estrada and Assistant Director Angie Meyer administered CPR and deployed an automated defibrillator; it took three attempts for his pulse to return. Odenkirk was rushed to Presbyterian Hospital, where two stents were put in his body to relieve plaque buildup. Odenkirk was treated without further surgery and took a five-week break from filming, requiring production to make accommodating schedule changes. In mid-August, Dalton said scenes not involving Odenkirk were being filmed, but Odenkirk had not yet been given clearance to return. Odenkirk confirmed by early September 2021 that he was back on set filming.

After the series concluded, Gould said that had Odenkirk not recovered, he and the producers likely would not have continued on without their star and dropped the show.

==== Averted IATSE strike ====
In October 2021, a potential strike by the International Alliance of Theatrical Stage Employees (IATSE) would have resulted in all productions in the New Mexico film and television industry shutting down, including Better Call Saul. Odenkirk, Gould, New Mexico Governor Michelle Lujan Grisham and several members of the New Mexico state legislature voiced their support for the IATSE and for creating better working conditions for the unionized crew members. On October 16, 2021, a tentative agreement was made before the deadline between the IATSE and the Alliance of Motion Picture and Television Producers, temporarily averting a strike. The contract was ratified by the IATSE members on November 15, 2021, ending all prospects of a strike and allowing production to continue without interruption.

=== Title sequences ===
With the final season featuring thirteen episodes instead of the usual ten, the title sequences took a new format. During "Nippy", the title sequence features Saul Goodman's "World's Greatest Lawyer" mug falling off his desk and shattering on the floor, as was typical during a season's tenth episode. However, the title image and music prematurely stops and is replaced by a blue screen, recreating the effects of a home video recording on a VCR, and then displayed the show's title and creator credits. This is also the first episode to take place entirely after the events of Breaking Bad. The remaining three title sequences retain the blue background, but briefly flash to an image previously unseen in the intro, with a distorted version of the theme song playing underneath. They then revert to the blue background again and display the title and creator credits. Before the show resumes, they again briefly flash to another new image that will be seen later on in the episodes.

== Episodes ==
Better Call Saul season 6 episodes
No. overall	No. in season	Title	Directed by	Written by	Original release date	U.S. viewers (millions)
Part One
51	1	"Wine and Roses"	Michael Morris	Peter Gould	April 18, 2022	1.42
In a flashforward, police seize personal property from Saul's mansion, including his white Cadillac; Kim's souvenir tequila bottle stopper falls out of a cabinet as it's loaded onto a truck. In 2004, Gus arranges for Nacho to hide at a motel. Juan Bolsa tells Gus that Nacho aided in killing Lalo and that the cartel has placed a bounty on him. Jimmy and Kim begin their plan to force a resolution of the Sandpiper case by discrediting Howard. Kim surveils Howard and Cliff Main during a round of golf, while Jimmy sneaks into the club locker room to plant a bag of fake cocaine in Howard's locker. Lalo arrives at the home of his tenants Sylvia and Mateo, kills them, and moves Mateo's body to his home to be identified as his own. Lalo calls Hector and lets him know he is alive and that he believes Gus orchestrated the attack; Hector advises him to find proof. Lalo realizes the evidence isn't in the United States and abandons his plan to sneak across the border.
52	2	"Carrot and Stick"	Vince Gilligan	Thomas Schnauz & Ariel Levine	April 18, 2022	1.16
Gus's men replace Nacho's safe with a duplicate, into which Mike places Nacho's cash and fake Canadian ID along with an envelope. Gus and Bolsa promise Hector they will avenge Lalo, but Hector's demeanor convinces Gus that Lalo survived. Bolsa breaks into the duplicate safe and finds the envelope, which contains details of an offshore bank account as well as the motel's phone number. Nacho deduces Gus' betrayal and he escapes during a shootout just as the Cousins arrive to capture him. Gus orders Nacho's father, Manuel, to be taken hostage to force Nacho to give himself up, but Mike refuses, prompting a standoff with Gus and Tyrus; Nacho calls Mike to speak to Gus. Jimmy meets the Kettlemans at their fraudulent tax preparation service and cons them into believing they have grounds for a lawsuit against Howard. They reject his services and instead ask Cliff to sue for ineffective counsel over Howard's alleged cocaine usage during Craig's embezzlement case, but he refuses. Jimmy unsuccessfully tries to bribe the Kettlemans into silence, but Kim coerces them by threatening to reveal their scam to the IRS. Jimmy and Kim leave, with an unknown person following them.
53	3	"Rock and Hard Place"	Gordon Smith	Gordon Smith	April 25, 2022	1.16
Nacho's truck is damaged in the firefight with the Cousins, forcing him to hide. The next day, he contacts his father to say farewell, then calls Gus and offers to surrender if his father is protected. Jimmy and Kim plot to obtain a duplicate of Howard's car but realize obtaining access to his car is more feasible. Prosecutor Suzanne Ericsen connects Jimmy to Lalo and asks Kim to persuade Jimmy to reveal information about him. Gus arranges for Nacho to be smuggled into the U.S., after which Nacho and Mike go over Nacho's part of the plan to absolve Gus for Lalo's death. Jimmy and Kim work with Huell to obtain duplicates of Howard's car key and remote unlock button. Mike takes a firing position with his rifle so he can observe Nacho's confession to Hector and the Cousins. Nacho falsely claims he tried to kill Lalo for the Alvarez drug family, and bolsters his credibility by admitting his previous attempt to kill Hector. Rather than avoiding torture by having Victor kill him in a fake escape attempt, Nacho uses a piece of broken glass to cut his restraints, then kills himself with Bolsa's gun.
54	4	"Hit and Run"	Rhea Seehorn	Ann Cherkis	May 2, 2022	1.16
Kim meets with Cliff while Jimmy, disguised as Howard, takes his car. He picks up Wendy from a motel, then pretends to force her out of the car while driving past Kim and Cliff, making it appear as if Howard is using prostitutes. While dropping off Wendy, Kim notices a car following her. Jimmy discovers that defending Lalo has made him disliked among his colleagues, but improved his reputation with local criminals, who now seek his representation. After being evicted from the nail salon, Jimmy scouts out a new office. While meeting a pro bono client, Kim spots the same car following her and confronts the driver. Mike approaches her and reveals that the men work for him, that Lalo is alive, and they are attempting to find him by surveilling those he may attempt to contact. Kim meets with Jimmy to view his potential new office. She approves, but does not reveal her conversation with Mike. Gus uses a home connected to his via a tunnel as an operations center, where teams under Mike's supervision surveil Albuquerque for signs of Lalo.
55	5	"Black and Blue"	Melissa Bernstein	Alison Tatlock	May 9, 2022	1.22
Kim and Gus both remain paranoid about Lalo. Jimmy rehires Francesca as his assistant. Kim uses Viola to learn Rand Casimiro will mediate the Sandpiper case. After Howard persuades the Sandpiper clients not to settle, Cliff confronts him about his apparent cocaine and prostitution habits, with Howard realizing Jimmy is sabotaging him. Howard challenges Jimmy to a boxing match, which he wins. He tells Jimmy he hopes this ends their dispute, but later asks a private investigator to watch Jimmy. Gus hides a handgun on an excavator at the site of his planned meth lab. Using an alias, Lalo tracks down Werner Ziegler's widow Margarethe at a bar in Germany and obtains information about Werner. The next morning, Lalo breaks into Margarethe's home and finds a gift from Werner's construction crew. Margarethe returns home unexpectedly, but Lalo succeeds in escaping unseen.
56	6	"Axe and Grind"	Giancarlo Esposito	Ariel Levine	May 16, 2022	1.13
Howard's PI reports that Jimmy and Kim are keeping a regular routine, except for a recent cash withdrawal. Jimmy and Kim procure a drug from Dr. Caldera for use in their scheme against Howard. Caldera tells them he is retiring from crime and shows them his encrypted book of criminal contacts. Jimmy and his camera crew photograph an actor impersonating Casimiro. Cliff invites Kim to Santa Fe to meet representatives of a foundation that finances projects similar to her pro bono criminal defense work, which takes place the same day she and Jimmy execute their plan against Howard. Jimmy encourages her to go, but later spots Casimiro, whose arm is broken, something not depicted in their photos. He alerts Kim, who returns to Albuquerque. The maker's label on the gift Werner's crew gave Margarethe enables Lalo to find Casper; Lalo gains the upper hand in the ensuing struggle and interrogates Casper about Werner's project.
57	7	"Plan and Execution"	Thomas Schnauz	Thomas Schnauz	May 23, 2022	1.19
On the day of the Sandpiper settlement conference, Jimmy and Kim hastily reshoot their photos with the actor impersonating Casimiro, then pass them to Howard's private investigator, who is actually working for them. Howard ingests Caldera's drug upon contact with the photos and embarrasses himself at the conference by appearing manic and accusing Casimiro of accepting a bribe. Howard and Cliff are forced to settle the Sandpiper case for less than they wanted. Lalo surveils Gus' laundry to learn about construction of the hidden meth lab. Realizing Gus is monitoring Hector's calls, Lalo tells Hector he will attack Gus that night. Mike alerts Gus and redirects his security teams to protect Gus, leaving Kim and Jimmy's apartment unprotected. Howard deduces that Jimmy and Kim plotted his character assassination and confronts them at their apartment. Lalo arrives soon afterward; Kim urges Howard to leave, but Lalo shoots and kills him.
Part Two
58	8	"Point and Shoot"	Vince Gilligan	Gordon Smith	July 11, 2022	1.16
Lalo gives Jimmy an address, then orders him to go there and shoot the occupant, whose description matches Gus. Jimmy convinces Lalo to send Kim, after which Lalo leaves Jimmy tied to a chair, informing him about Nacho's role in the attempted assassination. Mike intercepts Kim at Gus' front door; when she explains that Lalo is alive, Mike orders his men to her apartment. Gus realizes that sending Kim to his house was a diversion and drives to the laundry. Lalo ambushes Gus and kills his bodyguards, then forces Gus to show him the lab while he videotapes it as evidence of Gus' disloyalty to show Don Eladio. Gus cuts power to the lights and kills Lalo with the handgun he previously hid. Mike and his men remove Howard's body from Jimmy and Kim's apartment and stage his death as a suicide. Mike advises them to adhere to their story that Howard was a cocaine addict, then supervises the burial of Howard and Lalo's bodies under the floor of the lab.
59	9	"Fun and Games"	Michael Morris	Ann Cherkis	July 18, 2022	1.22
Gus convinces the cartel that despite Hector's accusations, he was not responsible for Lalo's death. As a consolation, Eladio grants the Salamancas the South Valley drug territory while giving Gus the area north of it. Gus goes to a wine bar and converses with his favorite sommelier, but cuts the outing short and orders construction on the lab to resume. Mike visits Manuel Varga to inform him of Nacho's death and promise justice for Nacho, but Manuel dismissively tells Mike he is no different from his criminal associates. At Howard's memorial service, Jimmy and Kim learn that HHM is downsizing and changing its name, and Kim lies to Howard's widow Cheryl about his alleged cocaine addiction. The next day, a remorseful Kim relinquishes her law license and separates from Jimmy, telling him that even though she loves him, they are bad for each other. Sometime later, Jimmy fully embraces his Saul Goodman persona, living in a mansion and driving a Cadillac DeVille, and remodelling his office into the tacky style in which it appears in Breaking Bad.
60	10	"Nippy"	Michelle MacLaren	Alison Tatlock	July 25, 2022	1.20
In Omaha in 2010, Jimmy, as Gene Takavic, ingratiates himself with Marion, the elderly mother of Jeff, the cab driver who recognized him as Saul Goodman. (Note: Seen in the season 4 episode "Smoke" and the season 5 episode "Magic Man".) In exchange for his silence, Gene offers to let Jeff in on "the game". He trains Jeff and his partner Buddy for roles in the robbery of a department store at the mall where Gene works. He distracts the mall's security guards so Jeff can steal expensive merchandise without being observed. During the heist, Jeff slips and knocks himself unconscious; Gene gains him extra time by feigning an emotional breakdown to hold the guard's attention. They get away with thousands of dollars in stolen goods, but Gene warns Jeff and Buddy to avoid him in the future, threatening to turn them in if they reveal his identity to authorities. Energized by the robbery's success, Gene finds a Goodman-style shirt in the department store, but wistfully leaves without purchasing it.
61	11	"Breaking Bad"	Thomas Schnauz	Thomas Schnauz	August 1, 2022	1.34
In a flashback to 2008 Albuquerque, Saul is taken to the desert by Walter White and Jesse Pinkman, becoming their lawyer after deducing Walt to be "Heisenberg", the chemist behind the high-purity blue methamphetamine being sold on the streets. Mike informs Saul that Walt has terminal lung cancer and cautions against helping him, but Saul visits Walt at his high school classroom and proposes a partnership (Note: Depicted in the Breaking Bad episode "Better Call Saul".). In 2010, Gene makes a prearranged call to Francesca, who tells him that the FBI has seized most of his assets and that Kim asked about him. Gene reaches Kim in Florida, but the call upsets him. Gene then enlists Jeff and Buddy for a new con, in which Gene gets a wealthy single male victim drunk, Jeff drives him home while giving him water laced with barbiturates, and Buddy enters his home to photograph IDs, credit cards, and financial records to sell to identity thieves. After a string of successful thefts, their latest target reveals he has cancer, causing Buddy to back out; Gene fires him and has Jeff drive him to the man's home so he can break in himself.
62	12	"Waterworks"	Vince Gilligan	Vince Gilligan	August 8, 2022	1.32
In a flashback, Kim meets with Saul to finalize their divorce and has an encounter with Jesse outside Saul's office. In 2010, Kim has been living a painfully mundane life in Florida, working a dead-end job at a sprinkler manufacturer when she receives a call from Gene. She asks him to turn himself in and hangs up when he refuses and demands her to do the same. Guilt-stricken, she travels to Albuquerque and gives Howard's wife, Cheryl, a copy of an affidavit she provided to the district attorney, which lays out the plan to destroy Howard's reputation and the circumstances of his death. Afterward, she has an emotional breakdown on the airport shuttle bus. Gene's mark wakes up unexpectedly and Gene makes a narrow escape. As Jeff waits for Gene, a police car idles behind him, causing Jeff to panic and run into the car in front of him. Jeff is arrested and Gene enlists Marion to help get Jeff released on bail. A suspicious Marion uses the new computer Jeff bought her to find Gene's true identity as Saul Goodman, then alerts the authorities via her Life Alert button, which forces Gene to flee.
63	13	"Saul Gone"	Peter Gould	Peter Gould	August 15, 2022	1.80
In separate flashbacks, Saul asks Mike and Walter about their regrets, then describes his; they each express disdain for the shallowness of his responses. In another flashback, Chuck expresses interest in Jimmy's legal practice and says it is not too late for Jimmy to change his path; Jimmy assumes Chuck is criticizing him and ends the conversation. In 2010, Gene is arrested, then enlists Bill Oakley as his counsel. They negotiate a plea deal that calls for only seven years in prison. Jimmy attempts to further reduce his sentence by offering to reveal details of Howard's death, only to learn that Kim has already done so. As Jimmy is extradited to Albuquerque, he claims to have testimony that will implicate Kim. At his sentencing, he admits he lied about Kim to ensure she would be present, then admits responsibility for Chuck's suicide, as well as his full involvement in Walt's drug empire, which results in an 86-year sentence. In prison, Jimmy is recognized as Saul and enjoys notoriety among his fellow inmates. Kim visits him and they share a cigarette. As she leaves, Jimmy makes their signature finger-gun gesture.

== Release ==
When the sixth season was ordered by AMC in January 2020, it was scheduled to premiere in 2021. However, in April 2020, Gilligan said that would depend on whether the cast and crew would be able to film in 2020 due to the COVID-19 pandemic. In February 2021, AMC confirmed that the sixth season would likely premiere in the first quarter of 2022. Gould's preference was to have all 13 episodes of the sixth season aired weekly and not for the season to be split in any manner; however, he noted that only AMC would decide the scheduling.

Variety reported on November 4, 2021, that the season would air over two halves, which was confirmed on the official announcement date on February 10, 2022. Gould said the writers did not know the season would be split into two parts until AMC announced it. The first seven episodes began airing on April 18, 2022, with the first two episodes airing back-to-back on the same day. Fans who attended PaleyFest in Los Angeles on April 9, 2022, received an early screening of the season premiere. The last six episodes aired starting airing July 11, 2022; fans who attended Tribeca Festival in New York on June 18, 2022, received an early screening of the mid-season premiere.

The seven-week break between both halves was shorter than the split final season of Breaking Bad, where the two halves aired a year apart. Splitting the season in two allowed the show to nominate each half of the season for different Emmy Awards ceremonies, as the first half was eligible for the 74th Primetime Emmy Awards in 2022, while eligibility for the 75th Primetime Emmy Awards began in June.

=== Broadcast and streaming ===
Each episode aired on AMC at 9:00 pm (ET) on Mondays, with the first two episodes premiering back-to-back on the same night. During the season's run, each episode became available to stream the day it premiered on AMC+, AMC's streaming service which first launched in June 2020. The season premiere resulted in the biggest day of new subscriber sign-ups for AMC+, and by the mid-season finale episodic viewership on the streaming service rose by 61%. Upon the release of the series finale, the app experienced an outage, causing many users to be logged out. AMC later reported that first-day viewing numbers for the finale on AMC+ was four times as big as the season premiere, and called the series' final season the highest acquisition driver in the history of the streaming service.

In certain international markets, like previous seasons, episodes were released on Netflix and other streaming services the day after their broadcast on AMC. The entire season was released on Netflix in the U.S. on April 18, 2023.

=== Home media ===
The sixth season was released on Blu-ray and DVD in region 1 on December 6, 2022; bonus features includes cast and crew audio commentaries on every episode, deleted scenes, outtakes, and various behind-the-scenes featurettes.

== Reception ==
=== Critical response ===
Better Call Saul season 6: Critical reception by episode
Season 6 (2022): Percentage of positive critics' reviews tracked by the website Rotten Tomatoes

The sixth season of Better Call Saul was widely acclaimed by critics. On Rotten Tomatoes, the season has an approval rating of 99% based on 182 reviews, with an average rating of 9.4/10. The website's critical consensus reads, "Better Call Saul remains as masterfully in control as Jimmy McGill keeps insisting he is in this final season, where years of simmering storytelling come to a scintillating boil." On Metacritic, the season has a score of 94 out of 100 based on 20 critics, indicating "universal acclaim".

After the airing of the series finale, Stuart Jeffries of The Guardian said that the series had surprisingly surpassed its predecessor in quality, saying: "Over six series, Better Call Saul evolved into a more profound and beautiful drama about human corruption than its predecessor. It mutated into something visually more sumptuous than Breaking Bad, while never, for a moment, losing its verbal dexterity and moral compass". Craig Elvy of Screen Rant also opined that the series was better than its predecessor, saying: "Jimmy McGill's spinoff leaves a very familiar legacy – sustained and enthusiastic praise from audiences and critics, capped by an ending that satisfies across the board." He went on to say: "When Better Call Saul began, many would've hoped the spinoff could either escape Breaking Bad's shadow, or somehow enhance Walt and Jesse's story with illuminating new details. Few dared dream Better Call Saul would achieve both, and the sheer ambition to create a spinoff that wholly embraces its predecessor whilst also existing in a totally different realm exemplifies why Better Call Saul has an ever-so-slight edge over Breaking Bad." Jeremy Urquhart of Collider made a comparison between the quality of both series’, saying: "Breaking Bad succeeds as a crime-thriller tragedy with a fast-paced plot, and Better Call Saul works as a slower-paced, character-focused drama (with some dark comedy)". He said his list "doesn't aim to argue that one is better than the other. It's a matter of personal preference, but it's hard to deny that there are certain things Better Call Saul does better, but also some areas where it isn't quite as great as its parent show."

==== Part 1 ====
The two-episode premiere "Wine and Roses" and "Carrot and Stick" received positive reviews from critics. David Segal of The New York Times described the first episode as "strong, twisty and gripping" and said the writing "must be hailed as a masterly curtain raiser, one that managed to pick up the story right where it was left, two years ago, and hurl it forward at a promising pace." Segal criticized Kim's con against Howard at the country club, calling it "dimmer and daffier than the rest of the show" and "pointlessly cruel". Reviewing both "Wine and Roses" and "Carrot and Stick" together, The A.V. Club's Kimberly Potts graded them with an "A" and gave positive notes to Gould's screenplay and the performances of the cast, especially those of Rhea Seehorn as Kim and Michael Mando as Nacho. Steve Greene, writing for IndieWire, said the first two episodes were "astonishingly short on false moves so far". He also noted Ed Begley Jr.'s acting as Clifford Main and the symbolism in Kim throwing away the "World's 2nd Best Lawyer" coffee mug, calling it "a poetic bookend of sorts." David Segal of The New York Times described the second episode as "superb and stressful" and said it was a "study in damage control, overseen by a man [Gus] who seems uncharacteristically ruffled and uncertain about what to do." Segal also said the shootout scene was "expertly staged" by Gilligan and that Rhea Seehorn's performance as Kim provided an opportunity for her to "demonstrate an almost thuggish toughness." Scott Tobias, writing for Vulture, compared the motel sequences to the Spaghetti Westerns of Sergio Leone, including Once Upon a Time in the West (1968). He also gave positive notes to the level of detail in the episode's opening scene, calling it "one big reason Better Call Saul stands apart from other shows."

The third episode "Rock and Hard Place", which concluded Nacho's arc, received acclaim by critics. Kaleena Rivera of Pajiba praised Michael Mando's display of rage and the episode's buildup to the ending. The A.V. Club's Kimberly Potts said Mando's acting was deserving of an Emmy nomination. She also compared Nacho's last words to Walter White's confession to Jesse Pinkman in the Breaking Bad episode "Ozymandias" and gave positive notes to the performances of Giancarlo Esposito and Mark Margolis and the show's development of Nacho as a compelling character. David Segal of The New York Times saluted Smith's screenplay and direction and the production design. He similarly compared Nacho's life to that of Jesse's—both criminals who made "some terrible life choices" and were "over-punished for them"—adding, "It would have been great to see more of this stellar actor, but if you must leave a show, a more dramatic and affecting end is hard to imagine."

The mid-season finale "Plan and Execution", which showcased the culmination of Saul and Kim's plot to ruin Howard's career and reputation, received acclaim, particularly for Patrick Fabian's performance. Scott Tobias of Vulture and Nick Harley of Den of Geek shared five out of five ratings for the episode, while Kimberly Potts from The A.V. Club and Steve Greene from IndieWire both gave the episode an "A" grade.

==== Part 2 ====
The mid-season premiere "Point and Shoot", which concluded Lalo's arc, was met with critical acclaim. It received five out of five from The Guardian's Stuart Jeffries and The Times's James Jackson, four out of five from Scott Tobias of Vulture, Nick Harley of Den of Geek, and Ed Power of The Daily Telegraph, and "A" grades from The A.V. Club's Kimberly Potts, IndieWire's Steve Greene, and Entertainment Weekly's Darren Franich.

The series finale "Saul Gone" received critical acclaim. Giving the episode an A grade, Kimberly Potts of The A.V. Club called it a "supremely satisfying sendoff" with "blasts from the past and one last twist". At IGN, Rafael Motamayor gave the episode a ten out of ten rating, describing it as a "subtler character study, exploring regrets and change in its protagonist". He also noted the episode title and complimented it for being "a thematic bookend on a show that was never really about Saul Goodman" and highlighted the motif of time machines. Similarly, Vulture's Jen Chaney also discussed the motif of time machines in the episode, and commended it for offering more depth and context to Breaking Bad, and felt the series was superior to Breaking Bad, as it "dared to widen its scope and go bigger than Breaking Bad ever did". In addition, the website's Scott Tobias gave it a five out of five rating and wrote, "'Saul Gone' [...] finds an ending for Jimmy that's hopeful and authentic without feeling rosy or unearned".

==== Critics' top ten list ====
2022
- No. 1 Complex
- No. 1 Consequence
- No. 1 Entertainment Weekly (Darren Franich)
- No. 1 The Hollywood Reporter (Angie Han)
- No. 1 The Playlist
- No. 1 Slant
- No. 1 Time
- No. 1 TV Guide
- No. 1 WatchMojo
- No. 1 Uproxx
- No. 2 Adweek
- No. 2 BBC
- No. 2 BuddyTV
- No. 2 The Hollywood Reporter (Daniel Fienberg)
- No. 2 NME
- No. 2 Polygon
- No. 2 Primetimer
- No. 2 The Ringer
- No. 2 Rolling Stone
- No. 2 TVLine
- No. 2 Vulture (Jen Chaney)
- No. 3 The A.V. Club
- No. 3 Empire
- No. 4 Entertainment Weekly (Kristen Baldwin)
- No. 4 Paste
- No. 4 ScreenCrush
- No. 4 The Watch (Chris Ryan)
- No. 6 IndieWire
- No. 6 The Watch (Andy Greenwald)
- No. 7 Decider
- No. 8 Exclaim!
- No. 10 TV Insider
- – The Economist
- – Lifehacker
- – The New York Times (Margaret Lyons – final-season shows only)
- – The New York Times (James Poniewozik)

== Accolades ==
Awards and nominations received by the sixth season of Better Call Saul
Award	Date of ceremony	Category	Recipient(s)	Result	Ref.
TCA Awards	August 6, 2022	Program of the Year	Better Call Saul	Nominated	
TCA Awards	August 6, 2022	Outstanding Achievement in Drama	Better Call Saul	Nominated	
TCA Awards	August 6, 2022	Individual Achievement in Drama	Bob Odenkirk	Nominated	
TCA Awards	August 6, 2022	Individual Achievement in Drama	Rhea Seehorn	Nominated	
TCA Awards	August 7, 2023	Program of the Year	Better Call Saul	Nominated	
TCA Awards	August 7, 2023	Outstanding Achievement in Drama	Better Call Saul	Nominated	
TCA Awards	August 7, 2023	Individual Achievement in Drama	Rhea Seehorn	Won	
Hollywood Critics Association Awards	August 13, 2022	Best Cable Network Series, Drama	Better Call Saul	Won (Note: Tied with Succession.)	
Hollywood Critics Association Awards	August 13, 2022	Best Actor in a Broadcast Network or Cable Series, Drama	Bob Odenkirk	Won	
Hollywood Critics Association Awards	August 13, 2022	Best Supporting Actor in a Broadcast Network or Cable Series, Drama	Giancarlo Esposito	Won	
Hollywood Critics Association Awards	August 13, 2022	Best Supporting Actor in a Broadcast Network or Cable Series, Drama	Jonathan Banks	Nominated	
Hollywood Critics Association Awards	August 13, 2022	Best Supporting Actor in a Broadcast Network or Cable Series, Drama	Michael Mando	Nominated	
Hollywood Critics Association Awards	August 13, 2022	Best Supporting Actress in a Broadcast Network or Cable Series, Drama	Rhea Seehorn	Won	
Primetime Creative Arts Emmy Awards	September 3–4, 2022	Outstanding Music Supervision	Thomas Golubić (for "Black and Blue")	Nominated	
Primetime Creative Arts Emmy Awards	September 3–4, 2022	Outstanding Sound Editing for a Comedy or Drama Series (One Hour)	Nick Forshager, Kathryn Madsen, Jane Boegel, Matt Temple, Marc Glassman, Jeff Cranford, Jason Tregoe Newman, Gregg Barbanell and Alex Ullrich (for "Carrot and Stick")	Nominated	
Primetime Creative Arts Emmy Awards	September 3–4, 2022	Outstanding Sound Mixing for a Comedy or Drama Series (One Hour)	Larry Benjamin, Kevin Valentine and Philip W. Palmer (for "Carrot and Stick")	Nominated	
Primetime Creative Arts Emmy Awards	January 6–7, 2024	Outstanding Short Form Comedy, Drama or Variety Series	Better Call Saul: Filmmaker Training	Nominated	
Primetime Creative Arts Emmy Awards	January 6–7, 2024	Outstanding Picture Editing for a Drama Series	Skip Macdonald (for "Saul Gone")	Nominated	
Primetime Creative Arts Emmy Awards	January 6–7, 2024	Outstanding Sound Mixing for a Comedy or Drama Series (One-Hour)	Larry Benjamin, Kevin Valentine, Phillip W. Palmer (for "Saul Gone")	Nominated	
Primetime Emmy Awards	September 12, 2022	Outstanding Drama Series	Better Call Saul	Nominated	
Primetime Emmy Awards	September 12, 2022	Outstanding Lead Actor in a Drama Series	Bob Odenkirk (for "Plan and Execution")	Nominated	
Primetime Emmy Awards	September 12, 2022	Outstanding Supporting Actress in a Drama Series	Rhea Seehorn (for "Hit and Run")	Nominated	
Primetime Emmy Awards	September 12, 2022	Outstanding Writing for a Drama Series	Thomas Schnauz (for "Plan and Execution")	Nominated	
Primetime Emmy Awards	January 15, 2024	Outstanding Drama Series	Better Call Saul	Nominated	
Primetime Emmy Awards	January 15, 2024	Outstanding Lead Actor in a Drama Series	Bob Odenkirk (for "Saul Gone")	Nominated	
Primetime Emmy Awards	January 15, 2024	Outstanding Supporting Actress in a Drama Series	Rhea Seehorn (for "Waterworks")	Nominated	
Primetime Emmy Awards	January 15, 2024	Outstanding Writing for a Drama Series	Gordon Smith (for "Point and Shoot")	Nominated	
Primetime Emmy Awards	January 15, 2024	Outstanding Writing for a Drama Series	Peter Gould (for "Saul Gone")	Nominated	
Saturn Awards	October 25, 2022	Best Network or Cable Action/Thriller Television Series	Better Call Saul	Won	
Saturn Awards	October 25, 2022	Robert Forster Artist's Award	Ensemble cast of Better Call Saul	Won	
Saturn Awards	October 25, 2022	Best Actor in a Network or Cable Television Series	Bob Odenkirk	Won	
Saturn Awards	October 25, 2022	Best Actress in a Network or Cable Television Series	Rhea Seehorn	Won	
Saturn Awards	October 25, 2022	Best Supporting Actor in a Network or Cable Television Series	Jonathan Banks	Won	
Saturn Awards	October 25, 2022	Best Supporting Actor in a Network or Cable Television Series	Tony Dalton	Nominated	
Saturn Awards	October 25, 2022	Best Supporting Actor in a Network or Cable Television Series	Patrick Fabian	Nominated	
Saturn Awards	October 25, 2022	Best Supporting Actor in a Network or Cable Television Series	Michael Mando	Nominated	
Golden Globe Awards	January 10, 2023	Best Television Series – Drama	Better Call Saul	Nominated	
Golden Globe Awards	January 10, 2023	Best Actor in a Television Series – Drama	Bob Odenkirk	Nominated	
Critics' Choice Television Awards	January 15, 2023	Best Drama Series	Better Call Saul	Won	
Critics' Choice Television Awards	January 15, 2023	Best Actor in a Drama Series	Bob Odenkirk	Won	
Critics' Choice Television Awards	January 15, 2023	Best Supporting Actor in a Drama Series	Giancarlo Esposito	Won	
Critics' Choice Television Awards	January 15, 2023	Best Supporting Actress in a Drama Series	Carol Burnett	Nominated	
Critics' Choice Television Awards	January 15, 2023	Best Supporting Actress in a Drama Series	Rhea Seehorn	Nominated	
Art Directors Guild Awards	February 18, 2023	Excellence in Production Design for a One-Hour Contemporary Single-Camera Series	Denise Pizzini (for "Nippy" and "Wine and Roses")	Nominated	
Directors Guild of America Awards	February 18, 2023	Outstanding Directorial Achievement in Dramatic Series	Vince Gilligan (for "Waterworks")	Nominated	
NAACP Image Awards	February 25, 2023	Outstanding Directing in a Drama Series	Giancarlo Esposito (for "Axe and Grind")	Won	
Producers Guild of America Awards	February 25, 2023	Outstanding Producer of Episodic Television, Drama	Better Call Saul	Nominated	
Golden Reel Awards	February 26, 2023	Outstanding Achievement in Sound Editing – Broadcast Long Form Dialogue and ADR	Nick Forshager, Kathryn Madsen and Jane Boegel (for "Saul Gone")	Nominated	
Golden Reel Awards	February 26, 2023	Outstanding Achievement in Sound Editing – Broadcast Long Form Effects and Foley	Nick Forshager, Kathryn Madsen, Matt Temple, Marc Glassman, Gregg Barbanell and Alex Ullrich (for "Carrot and Stick")	Nominated	
Screen Actors Guild Awards	February 26, 2023	Outstanding Performance by an Ensemble in a Drama Series	Jonathan Banks, Ed Begley Jr., Tony Dalton, Giancarlo Esposito, Patrick Fabian, Bob Odenkirk and Rhea Seehorn	Nominated	
Screen Actors Guild Awards	February 26, 2023	Outstanding Performance by a Male Actor in a Drama Series	Jonathan Banks	Nominated	
Screen Actors Guild Awards	February 26, 2023	Outstanding Performance by a Male Actor in a Drama Series	Bob Odenkirk	Nominated	
Satellite Awards	March 3, 2023	Best Drama Series	Better Call Saul	Nominated	
Satellite Awards	March 3, 2023	Best Actor in a Drama / Genre Series	Bob Odenkirk	Won	
Satellite Awards	March 3, 2023	Best Actress in a Drama / Genre Series	Rhea Seehorn	Nominated	
Satellite Awards	March 3, 2023	Best Actor in a Supporting Role in a Series, Miniseries, or Motion Picture Made for Television	Giancarlo Esposito	Nominated	
Cinema Audio Society Awards	March 4, 2023	Outstanding Achievement in Sound Mixing for Television Series – One Hour	Phillip W. Palmer, Larry Benjamin, Kevin Valentine, Chris Navarro and Stacey Michaels (for "Saul Gone")	Won	
American Society of Cinematographers Awards	March 5, 2023	Outstanding Achievement in Cinematography in Episode of a Series for Commercial Television	Marshall Adams (for "Saul Gone")	Nominated	
Writers Guild of America Awards	March 5, 2023	Drama Series	Ann Cherkis, Vince Gilligan, Peter Gould, Ariel Levine, Thomas Schnauz, Gordon Smith and Alison Tatlock	Nominated	
Writers Guild of America Awards	March 5, 2023	Episodic Drama	Thomas Schnauz (for "Plan and Execution")	Won	
Writers Guild of America Awards	March 5, 2023	Episodic Drama	Gordon Smith (for "Rock and Hard Place")	Nominated	

== Related media ==
=== American Greed: James McGill ===
On April 1, 2022, a few weeks before the season premiere, the CNBC Prime YouTube account uploaded American Greed: James McGill. Written by Peter Gould's assistant Valerie Chu, the ten-minute short is a mockumentary done in the style of the documentary series American Greed and recaps the events of both Breaking Bad and Better Call Saul. Narrated by Stacy Keach, the mockumentary has interviews of several recurring Better Call Saul characters, including DA Suzanne Ericsen (Julie Pearl), Deputy DA Bill Oakley (Peter Diseth), and Kim Wexler's former boss Rich Schweikart (Dennis Boutsikaris). Also making reappearances are Betsy and Craig Kettleman (Julie Ann Emery and Jeremy Shamos, respectively), who had not appeared on the series since the first season, but made additional canonical appearances in the short film No Picnic, which was released after the third season, and on the Inside the Gilliverse podcast in 2020. The short film was shot in Albuquerque in March 2022, a year after Emery and Shamos filmed the Better Call Saul episode "Carrot and Stick".

=== Talking Saul ===
Talking Saul made its return for Better Call Saul's sixth season, and aired following the mid-season finale as well as for the series' penultimate episode. Guests included Peter Gould, Bob Odenkirk, Rhea Seehorn and Patrick Fabian for the first episode, and Vince Gilligan, Peter Gould, Bob Odenkirk; and Rhea Seehorn (via satellite) for the second episode. The show had been off the air since after Better Call Saul's third season.

=== Slippin' Jimmy ===
Variety reported in March 2021 that AMC was developing an animated spinoff series, Slippin' Jimmy. The series was later revealed as a short-form series; a six-part animated series to be released online during the sixth season of Better Call Saul. Each episode is inspired by a specific film genre — from spaghetti Westerns and Buster Keaton to The Exorcist. The series was produced by Rick and Morty animators, Starburns Industries, and written by Better Call Saul writers Ariel Levine and Kathleen Williams-Foshee. Voice actors include Chi McBride, Laraine Newman, and Sean Giambrone as Jimmy. Six episodes of Slippin' Jimmy, each around 8–9 minutes in length, were released on AMC+ on May 23, 2022.

The series received negative reviews from fans and critics for its stark drop in quality compared to its predecessors. Mark Donaldson from Screen Rant criticized the concept, saying "the animated spinoff is being sold as a digital exclusive but this race to provide sellable content to audiences undermines storytelling ... the team behind both Breaking Bad and Better Call Saul have proven themselves to be savvy storytellers that respect the journeys of their characters over cheap cash-ins. It's this integrity that makes Slippin' Jimmy feel like such a misstep."

=== Filmmaker Training ===
For the sixth season, new episodes of the Better Call Saul Employee Training Video series, which had begun with the show's third season, were announced.

The employee videos released during the season were titled Filmmaker Training and premiered on July 11, 2022. The series consists of six episodes and focuses on the film crew that worked with Jimmy on his advertisements. The web series was nominated for Outstanding Short Form Comedy, Drama or Variety Series at the 75th Primetime Creative Arts Emmy Awards.
