= Point and Shoot (Better Call Saul) =

- Better Call Saul episode
- Promotional poster
- Episode no.: Season 6 Episode 8
- Directed by: Vince Gilligan
- Written by: Gordon Smith
- Cinematography by: Paul Donachie
- Editing by: Chris McCaleb
- Original air date: July 11, 2022
- Running time: 49 minutes

Guest appearances
- Ray Campbell as Tyrus Kitt; Harrison Thomas as Lyle; Jeremiah Bitsui as Victor

Episode chronology
← Previous "Plan and Execution"	Next → "Fun and Games"
- Better Call Saul season 6

"Point and Shoot" is the eighth episode and mid-season premiere of the sixth season of Better Call Saul, the spin-off television series of Breaking Bad. It was written by Gordon Smith and directed by series co-creator Vince Gilligan. It screened at the Tribeca Festival in New York on June 18, 2022, and aired on AMC and AMC+ in the United States and Canada on July 11, 2022, before debuting online in certain territories on Netflix the following day. In the episode, Jimmy McGill and Kim Wexler react to the death of their colleague Howard Hamlin at the hands of Lalo Salamanca, who orders them to help him carry out his plan in taking down Gus Fring.

On July 27, 2021, the first day of filming the episode, Bob Odenkirk (who plays Jimmy) suffered a "heart incident". Rosa Estrada, the on-set health safety supervisor, helped resuscitate him with an automated external defibrillator. Odenkirk was rushed to the hospital. The cause of the heart incident was allegedly plaque buildup he had known about since 2018 but had not medicated. After a five-week break, Odenkirk returned on set in September. The episode's opening scene, featuring Howard's car and personal effects at the beach, was shot months after the rest of the episode; it was also the last scene filmed for Better Call Saul.

"Point and Shoot" was met with critical acclaim for its direction, writing, cinematography, and performances (particularly Esposito). It marked the final appearance of both Howard (Patrick Fabian) and Lalo (Tony Dalton). An estimated 1.16 million viewers saw the episode during its first broadcast on AMC.

== Plot ==
=== Opening ===
A shoe washes onto an ocean beach, and its mate lies nearby. An open car door reveals classical music playing on the radio, and a wallet and wedding band on the dashboard. The car's vanity license plate, "NAMAST3", shows it to be Howard Hamlin's green Jaguar XJ8.

=== Main story ===
After killing Howard, Lalo Salamanca provides Jimmy McGill and Kim Wexler with an address and a loose description of Gus Fring and instructs Jimmy to drive there and shoot him; Jimmy convinces Lalo to send Kim instead. After she leaves, Lalo ties Jimmy to a chair and tells him about the attack on his Mexico house, facilitated by Nacho Varga. (Note: As seen in "Something Unforgivable".) Jimmy vehemently denies involvement and blames Nacho. (Note: The specific line "It wasn't me, it was Ignacio" is directly taken from the Breaking Bad episode "Better Call Saul".) Lalo gags Jimmy and leaves, promising to interrogate Jimmy after he returns. Mike Ehrmantraut apprehends Kim at Gus' front door. She explains that Lalo is holding Jimmy, then points to Gus' body double as matching the description Lalo provided. Mike orders his men to her apartment.

When Kim says Lalo agreed to let her switch places with Jimmy, Gus realizes the shooting attempt is a diversion, so he drives to Lavandería Brillante. Lalo is there intending to obtain video evidence for Don Eladio of Gus' planned meth lab, which will prove Gus' disloyalty to the cartel. He ambushes Gus and kills his bodyguards, then forces Gus to show him the lab. Gus leads Lalo through the site, which Lalo describes for Eladio using details provided by Casper. Gus insults Eladio and the Salamancas as Lalo videotapes him, but his speech is a distraction that enables him to trigger a power outage that turns off the lights. He reaches the handgun he previously hid, (Note: As seen in "Black and Blue".) then fires several shots at Lalo. After turning the lights on, Gus realizes he is bleeding, while Lalo is fatally wounded. Lalo succumbs to his injuries and dies.

Jimmy and Kim are reunited at their apartment. Mike tells them Lalo will not return, and his men remove Howard's body. Mike explains that Howard's death will be made to look like a suicide by drowning and instructs them to maintain their ruse that Howard was a cocaine addict, which will make the story more plausible. As Gus' wound is treated at his home, Mike supervises the burial of Howard and Lalo in a shared grave beneath the lab, but first removes Howard's shoes, wallet, and wedding ring.

== Production ==
"Point and Shoot" was the mid-season premiere of the sixth season of Better Call Saul. Breaking Bad and Better Call Saul creator Vince Gilligan directed the episode written by co-executive producer Gordon Smith.

The opening scene, with Howard's car and personal effects at the beach, was the last scene filmed for Better Call Saul and the only major scene ever shot for the series outside of Albuquerque, New Mexico. It was filmed in March 2022 in Leo Carrillo State Beach, California. Paul Donachie was the episode's cinematographer, though the opening scene had to be shot with cinematographer Marshall Adams as Donachie was in England at the time. As principal photography wrapped a month earlier, the footage was shot after production ended.

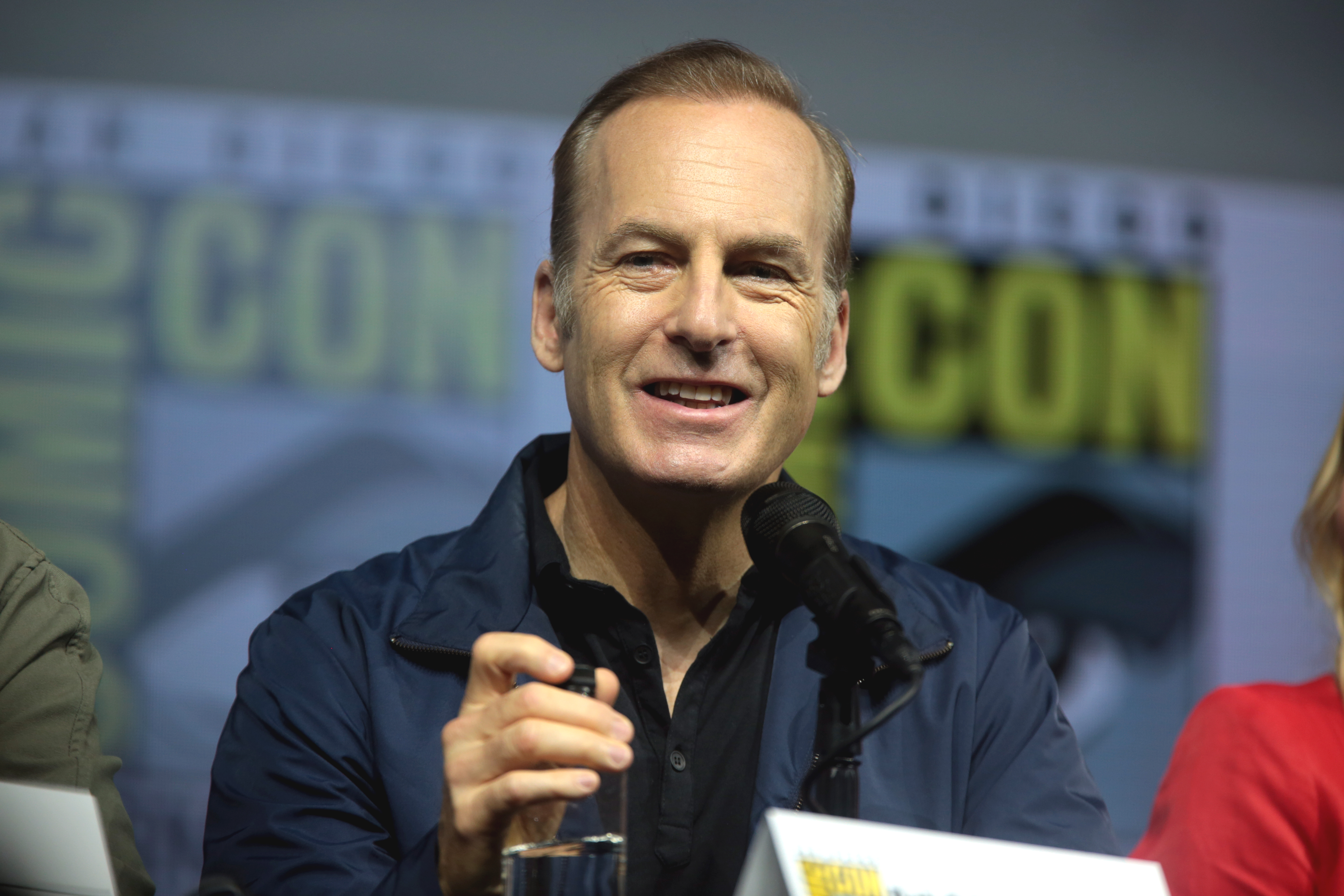
Lead actor Bob Odenkirk suffered a heart incident during the production of "Point and Shoot".

On July 27, 2021, the first day of filming "Point and Shoot", lead actor Bob Odenkirk (who plays Jimmy) suffered a heart incident. The incident occurred while he was on a break with series regulars Rhea Seehorn (Kim), Patrick Fabian (Howard), and Tony Dalton (Lalo) after shooting the scene where Lalo instructs Jimmy and Kim on what to do, which had run for twelve hours. In hindsight, Seehorn said she was grateful Odenkirk had decided to hang out with them instead of going to his trailer. The actors were in an empty studio where they would regularly take breaks. There, Odenkirk was in a plexiglass cubicle riding an exercise bike and watching a Chicago Cubs baseball game when he collapsed. The other actors were talking nearby, noticed, and called for help. Rosa Estrada, a former medic and on-set health safety supervisor, and assistant director Angie Meyer administered CPR and deployed an automated external defibrillator. It took three attempts for Odenkirk's pulse to return. He was rushed to Albuquerque's Presbyterian Hospital, where two stents were put in his body to relieve plaque buildup that he had known about since 2018 but had not medicated.

Odenkirk was treated without further surgery and took a five-week break from filming, requiring production to make some schedule changes to accommodate this. In mid-August, Dalton said scenes not involving Odenkirk were being filmed, but Odenkirk had not yet been given clearance to return. According to Gilligan and Smith, a large part of the apartment scene had been shot before the heart attack, primarily the coverage of Odenkirk and Seehorn. Two months later, in September 2021, Odenkirk came back on set. He shot the following episode, "Fun and Games", and then returned to shoot the rest of the scene from "Point and Shoot" when Gilligan was available, including Dalton's coverage and the portion where Jimmy is tied to a chair. Filming for the rest of the season was limited to a maximum of twelve hours a day as a result of the incident. After the series had concluded, Gould would say that had Odenkirk not recovered, he and the producers likely would not have continued on without their star and dropped the show.

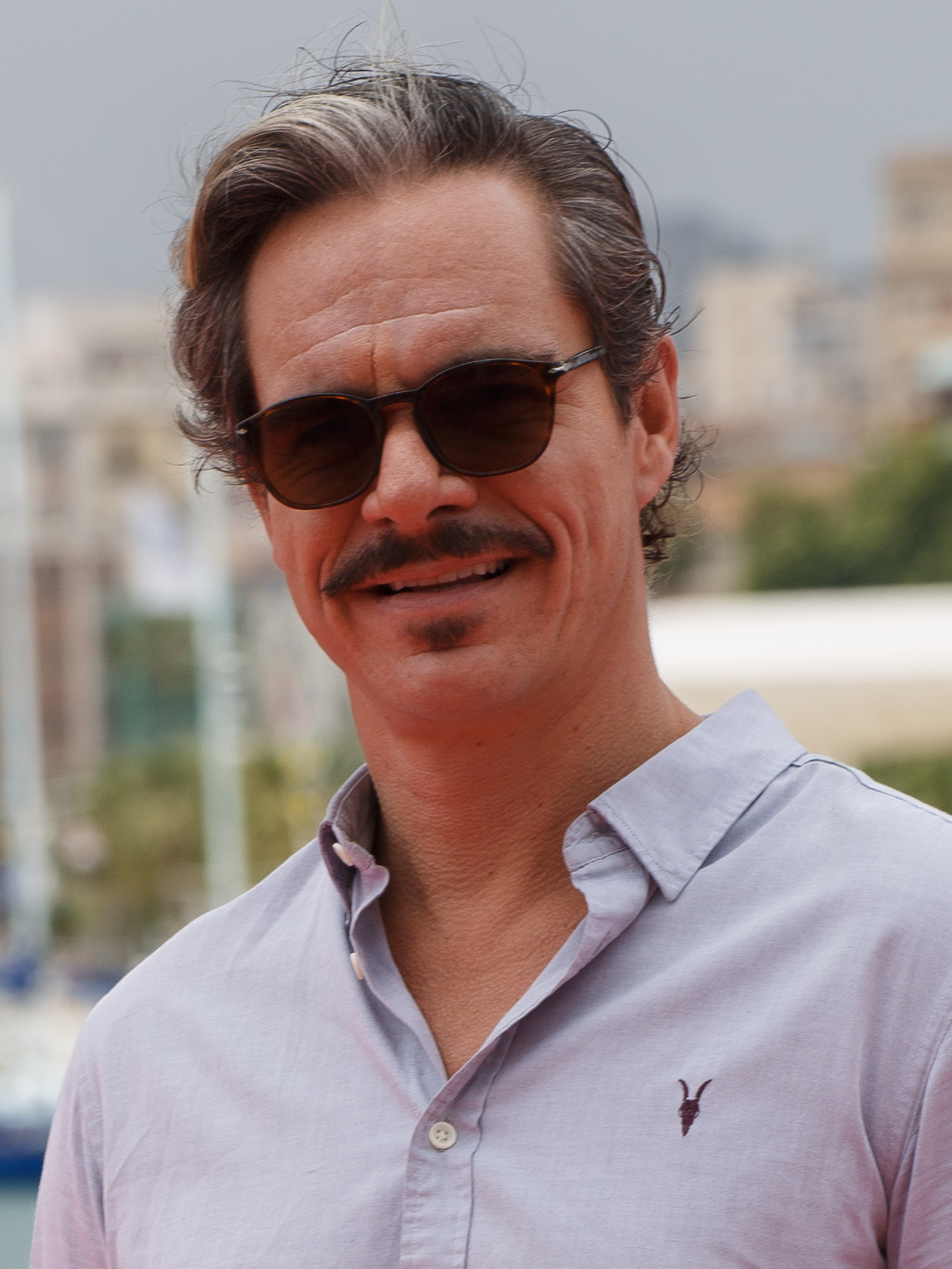
"Point and Shoot" marks the final appearance of Tony Dalton's character Lalo Salamanca.

"Point and Shoot" features the death of Lalo Salamanca, played by Dalton, who was introduced as a recurring character in Better Call Saul's fourth season. The writers decided to not write a definitive ending to the character until they explored all possibilities, and the decision to kill Lalo came late in the writing process. Dalton had been aware prior to the filming of the sixth season that his character would have an early exit, but he only received word of his character's death during the filming of the previous episode, "Plan and Execution". He said he read the screenplay for "Point and Shoot" outside of the rest stop where his character goes to take a shower in "Plan and Execution": "It was a night shoot, like one in the morning, and I grabbed a little chair and put it on the side of the rest stop next to the highway and just sat down. I was like, if this is going to be the end, I want to sit down and read this whole thing all the way through right now. And it was very cathartic."

Smith said they considered a shoot-out between Mike and Lalo but decided against it to let the two "biggest big bads" in the series come face to face. Smith wrote Gus's insults towards Don Eladio and the Salamancas as Gus using a tactic he learned from Nacho Varga in the episode "Rock and Hard Place", where a tied-up Nacho cuts his restraints while confessing to the Salamancas who "wanted to hear it, so their hate could be justified". Dalton, who would often joke about Smith's description of his character's last breath as "ugly" in the script, improvised Lalo's choice to smile and laugh after being shot by Gus. Gilligan chose to include it because he saw the moment as Lalo being surprised by Gus's sheer luck during the shoot-out in the dark. Dalton said the amount of fake blood on his face formed a puddle, so he continued lying down while the crew reset the scene. Lalo's dying laugh was shot in four to five takes.

Despite the character being dead, Fabian still appeared as Howard's corpse throughout the episode. Gilligan and executive producer Alison Tatlock came up with the idea of burying Lalo with Howard beneath the meth lab. Lalo, as well as Nacho, were both previously mentioned by name in the Breaking Bad episode "Better Call Saul". Smith said he wanted to leave "breadcrumbs" for viewers to connect the events of "Point and Shoot" to the Breaking Bad episode, using nearly the same lines that Jimmy, as Saul, shouted in a panic to Walter White and Jesse Pinkman from the latter. Smith said "That was our thinking in terms of making it that exact and that specific. It also helps us feel why Jimmy is so scared in Breaking Bad 208. He's carried the terror of this moment all these years. I think his lizard brain is always going to be sitting there with a gag in its mouth, going, 'Oh my god, at any second, Lalo could come and snuff out my life and the life of anyone I’ve ever cared about.'"

A crane shot in "Point and Shoot" (top) was purposely angled to resemble an overhead shot from the Breaking Bad episode "Thirty-Eight Snub" (bottom).

Smith's first choice for the episode's title was "House Cat", but "Point and Shoot" was eventually chosen to go along with the sixth season's recurring use of the word "and" in the title of most of its episodes. The scene with Lyle, Gus's assistant manager at the Los Pollos Hermanos restaurant, singing as he prepared to open the restaurant, was a nod to an inside joke among the staff of a spinoff musical involving Lyle following Gus's death in "Face Off". The overhead shot of Kim approaching Gus's house was purposely angled to resemble the overhead shot in the Breaking Bad episode "Thirty-Eight Snub" when Walter approaches Gus's house. It was captured early one morning around 4:30 am with the use of a scissor lift that held a camera platform several hundred feet in the air. Smith said replicating the shot was "nightmarishly difficult" due to lighting conditions. Producer Jenn Carroll was put in charge of holding an iPad in front of B camera operator Jordan Slovin so he could compare the two shots and get them to match. Due to the fact that they were filming in the middle of the night, and because the camera rig would beep every time it moved, the crew made sure to apologize to the neighborhood residents.

During post-production, the episode was edited by Chris McCaleb, and the score was composed by Dave Porter. Porter said composing the score was difficult because it was not clear to him which scenes definitely needed music, leading to several of his compositions not being used. The cello piece featured during Howard and Lalo's burial was originally written for the opening scene; Porter said, "When I shifted it over, it just happened to fall and fit very nicely with very few alterations in that final scene." The score during Dalton's scenes was composed to highlight Lalo's calculated nature despite the tension. To do so, Porter also added pieces of music he wrote for Lalo's character in the season five episodes "Bad Choice Road" and "Something Unforgivable" into the score for "Point and Shoot". Porter said his goal was to be "an extension of the writers" and "accentuate the things that I think you guys and gals were trying to achieve in the writers' room and the way the characters have been played".

== Reception ==
=== Critical response ===
"Point and Shoot" was met with critical acclaim. It received five out of five stars from The Guardian's Stuart Jeffries and The Times's James Jackson, four out of five stars from Scott Tobias of Vulture, Nick Harley of Den of Geek, and Ed Power of The Daily Telegraph, and "A" grades from The A.V. Club's Kimberly Potts, IndieWire's Steve Greene, and Entertainment Weekly's Darren Franich. Crew members that were recognized for their work on this episode included director Vince Gilligan, writer Gordon Smith, cinematographer Paul Donachie, and cast members Tony Dalton (Lalo), Giancarlo Esposito (Gus), Jonathan Banks (Mike), Bob Odenkirk (Jimmy), and Rhea Seehorn (Kim). The opening scene was also well received. On the review aggregator Rotten Tomatoes, 100% of thirteen reviews are positive, with an average rating of 9.5/10. The critical consensus reads, "'Point and Shoot' aims Better Call Saul towards an endgame and launches it forward at full throttle, sunsetting a fan favorite with fitting style while setting the stage for an agonizingly suspenseful home stretch."

Liz Shannon Miller of Consequence lauded the series's ability to create suspense in a story where certain characters are predetermined to survive. She described the scene where Jimmy convinces Lalo to send Kim in his place as a "masterclass moment for the series in general and Odenkirk as an actor in particular". Jackson said the episode "pulses with nocturnal suspense, your reward after several hours of carefully constructed plot".

The confrontation between Gus and Lalo was singled out as the high point of the episode. Tobias said Gus's invective about the Salamancas was reminiscent of the scene in True Romance (1993) where Dennis Hopper's character uses his last words to insult his executioner. However, Tobias was also critical of Gus's decision to hide a gun under the excavator, which he felt was "more a sign of narrative convenience than planning". Harley felt the second half of the episode was predictable but nevertheless "anxiety-inducing and gripping". He complimented Dalton's "wildly entertaining" performance and said "Point and Shoot" was, despite its flaws, "some damn good, well-made television with mesmerizing acting across the board". Potts lamented the departure of Dalton, praising the character's charisma and charm. She also opined Banks delivered a "typically outstanding performance" and described him as the actor "most frustratingly denied an Emmy" for his work on the show and its predecessor. Greene highlighted the camera work and Banks's "slow-burn, even keel" performance as the best parts of the episode. Michael Hogan of Vanity Fair compared Lalo to the Joker and the episode's storyline to Miami Vice and Beverly Hills Cop. "This is how it should be," he wrote, "a showdown between the two big baddies, nobody else around." Hogan described Gus's speech as a "fun spin" on the Hollywood cliche of a villain letting the hero give a speech because "we can't really be sure which of these drug lords is the hero and which is the villain, and the speech itself is just a stalling tactic". One aspect of the episode that received criticism was the shootout between Gus and Lalo. Power and Rolling Stone's Alan Sepinwall felt the scene was too darkly lit and compared it to the fight scene in the Game of Thrones episode "The Long Night". Power wrote, "Unfortunately, Better Call Saul has succumbed to the vogue for filming key scenes at night and in near total darkness ... [and] a seismic confrontation goes off with a muggy whimper." Despite this, Power gave the episode a positive review, concluding that Better Call Saul had "completed its transformation into one of the most riveting – and bleakest – dramas of the streaming age".

=== Ratings ===
An estimated 1.16 million viewers watched "Point And Shoot" during its first broadcast on AMC on July 11, 2022.
