= Plan and Execution =

- Better Call Saul episode
- Promotional poster
- Episode no.: Season 6 Episode 7
- Directed by: Thomas Schnauz
- Written by: Thomas Schnauz
- Cinematography by: Marshall Adams
- Editing by: Skip Macdonald
- Original air date: May 23, 2022
- Running time: 50 minutes

Guest appearances
- Ed Begley Jr. as Clifford Main; Dennis Boutsikaris as Rich Schweikart; Josh Fadem as Joey Dixon; Ray Campbell as Tyrus Kitt; Jessie Ennis as Erin Brill; John Ennis as Lenny; Jean Effron as Irene Landry; Hayley Holmes as The Make-Up Girl; Julian Bonfiglio as The Sound Guy; Lennie Loftin as Genindowski; John Posey as Rand Casimiro; Mark Margolis as Hector Salamanca

Episode chronology
← Previous "Axe and Grind"	Next → "Point and Shoot"
- Better Call Saul season 6

"Plan and Execution" is the seventh episode and mid-season finale of the sixth season of Better Call Saul, the spin-off television series of Breaking Bad. It was written and directed by Thomas Schnauz. It aired on May 23, 2022, on AMC and AMC+. In several countries outside the United States and Canada, it premiered on Netflix the following day.

In the episode, Jimmy McGill and Kim Wexler carry out their plan to discredit Howard Hamlin during the Sandpiper settlement hearing. Meanwhile, Lalo Salamanca resurfaces in Albuquerque after discovering the location of Gus Fring's secret meth lab.

"Plan and Execution" was met with critical acclaim for its direction, writing, cinematography, score, and on-screen performances, most notably that of Patrick Fabian as Howard. It has since been considered by some as Better Call Saul's finest episode and one of the greatest episodes of the entire Breaking Bad universe. An estimated 1.19 million viewers saw the episode during its first broadcast on AMC.

== Plot ==
On the day of the Sandpiper settlement mediation, Jimmy McGill, Kim Wexler, and Jimmy's film crew race to reshoot their photos of the actor portraying mediator Rand Casimiro, so the real Casimiro's broken arm will be depicted in the fake pictures. They coat the photos with the drug they procured from Dr. Caldera, then Jimmy gives them to Howard Hamlin's private investigator, who has been working with Jimmy and Kim all along.

Shortly before the mediation session starts at the Hamlin, Hamlin & McGill (HHM) office, Howard views the photos, which appear to show Jimmy giving someone the $20,000 he recently withdrew from the bank. Jimmy and Kim listen in on the conference call for the mediation. Howard is shocked to recognize Casimiro as the man from the photos and accuses him of accepting money from Jimmy. When Howard attempts to retrieve the photos from his office to prove his allegation, he finds they have been switched for innocuous photos of Jimmy. Howard's erratic behavior and dilated pupils cause the end of the mediation conference, and HHM and Davis & Main are compelled to settle the case for less than they expected.

Lalo Salamanca, who has returned from Germany, spends several days monitoring Gus Fring's laundry facility. He makes a videotape recording telling Don Eladio he has proof of Gus' disloyalty. Surmising that Gus is monitoring Hector Salamanca's calls, Lalo tells Hector he intends to attack Gus that night. Mike Ehrmantraut plays a recording of the call for Gus, then adds additional protection for Gus by redeploying security teams from targets considered low-priority for Lalo. Howard pieces together Jimmy and Kim's con and confronts them at their apartment. Lalo unexpectedly enters. Kim urges Howard to leave, but Lalo kills him with a gunshot to the head, horrifying Kim and Jimmy. Lalo urges them to keep quiet as he calmly utters “Let's talk.”

== Production ==
"Plan and Execution" was written and directed by Thomas Schnauz, a veteran writer on Better Call Saul and Breaking Bad. The episode features the death of Howard Hamlin, played by Patrick Fabian, a series regular since the first season. Fabian had been aware prior to the filming of the sixth season that his character would have an early exit but only received word of his character's death about two weeks before filming the episode, remarking that the writers characterized the moment as "a hinge that swings the rest of the season open". Schnauz said Howard's death was "inevitable" because "it just felt like something horrible had to happen as a result of the scam." Rhea Seehorn, who plays Kim, said Howard's death was "the embodiment of what Kim and Jimmy have been pretending is not true this whole season – that there are no consequences to their actions."

The writers explored dozens of possible ways for Howard's story to end. One idea they considered involved the return of the skateboarder twins from the first and second episodes of the series. In it, Howard would have been tricked into thinking he had run over and killed one of them. Schnauz said it was one of many "crazy different plots. We work on these stories for so long and so many days and we go down so many different roads that it's hard to say when it felt like we were on the right road. We just go piece by piece." Another idea would have seen Lalo taking Howard, Jimmy, and Kim hostage but they thought Lalo killing Howard was "a perfect way to scare the ever-living shit out of Jimmy and Kim, to put a bullet in this stranger's head and move on to part two of his plan." Schnauz and director of photography Marshall Adams shot Jimmy and Kim's reactions to Lalo's entrance in a number of ways, finding inspiration from a scene in the fifth-season episode "Bad Choice Road" where a series of intercuts show a traumatized Jimmy's reaction to the sounds of a juicer. Two cameras were set up on the face of actor Bob Odenkirk, who plays Jimmy, to capture the intercuts. Schnauz and editor Skip Macdonald initially submitted a version of the final scene to AMC and Sony that featured a close-up of Jimmy's pupil dilating. When the studios questioned the necessity of the shot, they ultimately decided simpler was better and instead used a shot of Lalo slowly appearing behind Howard as the characters watched in "grave, stunned silence".

Rumors of Howard's death began to circulate online in December 2021, when Odenkirk shared a photo of himself with Fabian, who was dressed in character and had blood in his hair. After "Plan and Execution" aired, Odenkirk admitted his mistake on Twitter: "Well the truth can be told. I screwed up." Fabian said the crew "just pretended there was nothing there, but I also had plenty of explanations for it as well. So I was glad it didn't go any further than it did."

The trick Howard performs to stop a shaken soda from fizzing was added in by Schnauz, who learned it from his father. Jennifer Bryan was the wardrobe designer for the suits Howard wears in the episode and throughout the season, which were handcrafted in Genoa and put together in Los Angeles by Di Stefano of Italy. The storm drain from which Lalo looks out with binoculars does not exist. The sewer system was built on a stage using pieces from the oil tanker from the sixth-season episode "Rock and Hard Place". Tony Dalton, who plays Lalo, shot his scenes on the stage. The storm drain was later digitally added to the scenes during post-production.

In August 2020, series co-creator Peter Gould said he was not in favor of splitting the sixth and final season into two parts. In February 2022, AMC revealed they would be splitting the season, with "Plan and Execution" as the mid-season finale before a six-week intermission. In May, Gould teased the episode by saying the cliffhanger was "a big one. I think this is going to be a painful few weeks for a few people to find out what happens." The day before the episode aired, Schnauz said, "Just to warn everyone: we wrote S6 of #BetterCallSaul to be aired as 13 continuous episodes, but various delays split the season in half. So 607 was not written or filmed as a traditional 'cliffhanger.'" After the episode aired, Gould said "it just so happened that Howard's death came right in the middle of the season. And it was a good breaking point, midseason, for AMC." Schnauz reiterated that the writers did not plan on having the event of Howard's death as a midseason finale and maintained that this was a coincidence.

== Reception ==
=== Critical response ===
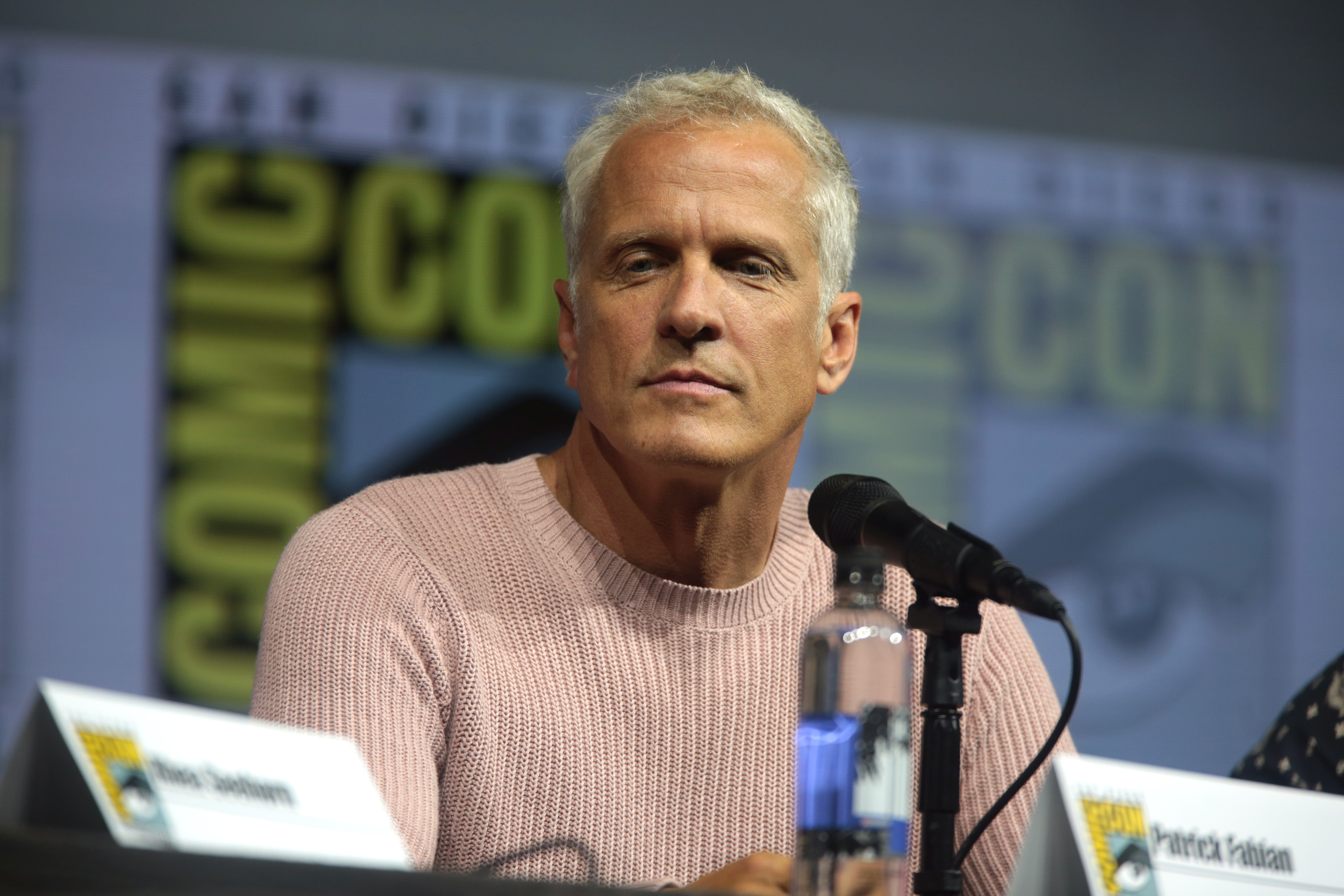
Patrick Fabian received critical acclaim for his performance as Howard Hamlin.

"Plan and Execution" received universal acclaim from critics, with many considering it to be one of the best of the series. On the review aggregator website Rotten Tomatoes, 100% of seven reviews are positive, with an average rating of 10/10. Scott Tobias of Vulture and Nick Harley of Den of Geek shared five out of five ratings for the episode, while Kimberly Potts from The A.V. Club and Steve Greene from IndieWire both gave it an "A" grade. Salon named it one of the six best TV episodes of the year. Crew members that were recognized for their work on this episode included writer and director Thomas Schnauz, composer Dave Porter, cinematographer Marshall Adams, and cast members Patrick Fabian, Bob Odenkirk, and Rhea Seehorn. The first half of the episode, depicting Jimmy and Kim's execution of their plan against Howard, was well received. Rolling Stone's Alan Sepinwall gave positive notes to Porter's score during these sequences, calling it "some of his jauntiest caper music of the series' entire run".

The attention to detail, such as the flickering of the burning candle, staging, and performances in the final scene received critical acclaim. Howard's death was compared to that of teenager Drew Sharp's death in the Breaking Bad episode "Dead Freight", in addition to the apartment scene from Pulp Fiction where Samuel L. Jackson's character casually shoots a man before asking the man's friend, "Oh, I'm sorry, did I break your concentration?" Melanie McFarland of Salon noted the double meaning behind the episode's title and categorized the reveal of what "execution" meant as "one of the darkest [scenes] in the series", though she said it was not on "the same level of tragedy" as the Breaking Bad episode "Ozymandias". Fabian's performance was highlighted as the episode's best. Greene said Fabian's scenes were "all delivered with the strength of someone who knows he's down to his last few scenes. Yet, Fabian doesn't overplay any of them. Even down to the 'Who are you?' Howard gives Lalo (a perfect delivery that somehow gives some levity to an impossibly tense situation), he never tips that the end is coming right around the corner. Suffice to say, Howard's death marks an undeniable shift for the home stretch."

=== Ratings ===
An estimated 1.19 million viewers watched "Plan and Execution" during its first broadcast on AMC on May 23, 2022. The episode's viewership increased by 87% to 2.2 million viewers after three days of delayed viewership. On AMC+, "Plan and Execution" was watched 61% more than the season premiere, "Wine and Roses".

=== Accolades ===
At the 74th Primetime Emmy Awards, Bob Odenkirk received a nomination for Outstanding Lead Actor in a Drama Series for this episode, while Thomas Schnauz received a nomination for Outstanding Writing for a Drama Series.
