= Something Unforgivable =

- Better Call Saul episode
- Promotional poster
- Episode no.: Season 5 Episode 10
- Directed by: Peter Gould
- Written by: Peter Gould; Ariel Levine
- Editing by: Skip Macdonald
- Original air date: April 20, 2020
- Running time: 60 minutes

Guest appearances
- Javier Grajeda as Juan Bolsa; Steven Bauer as Don Eladio Vuente; Roy Wood Jr. as Grant

Episode chronology
← Previous "Bad Choice Road"	Next → "Wine and Roses"
- Better Call Saul season 5

"Something Unforgivable" is the tenth and final episode of the fifth season of the AMC television series Better Call Saul, a spin-off series of Breaking Bad. The episode aired on April 20, 2020, on AMC in the United States and Canada. Outside of the United States, the episode premiered on streaming service Netflix in several countries.

== Plot ==
Jimmy McGill and Kim Wexler watch Lalo Salamanca depart. (Note: As seen in "Bad Choice Road".) Jimmy asks why Mike Ehrmantraut has been protecting him, but Mike hangs up. Jimmy tells Kim the truth about his desert trek with Mike. (Note: As seen in "Bagman".) Kim and Jimmy then check into a hotel to hide in case Lalo returns.

Mike tells Gus Fring that Lalo and Nacho Varga went to Lalo's Chihuahua home. Gus tells Mike he has sent assassins and suggests Nacho can help them. Lalo and Nacho arrive at Lalo's house, an expansive hacienda inside a large, walled compound, and are warmly greeted by family and friends. Nacho receives a call telling him to open Lalo's back gate at 3 a.m.

Kim ignores Jimmy's request to remain at the hotel, meets with the public defender, and accepts twenty pending felony cases pro bono. She tells Howard Hamlin she quit Schweikart & Cokely. Howard assumes Jimmy is behind Kim's decision and tells Kim about Jimmy's recent harassment campaign. (Note: As seen in "JMM".) Kim laughs at Howard, says she is insulted by the notion that she cannot decide for herself, and tells Howard he does not understand Jimmy. Howard angrily tells her that Chuck McGill knew Jimmy better than anyone else. (Note: Chuck's disapproval of Jimmy is first seen in "Pimento".)

Lalo prepares Nacho for his first meeting with Don Eladio. At the meeting, Lalo explains that Nacho is associated with Tuco Salamanca and will manage the Salamanca drug business while Lalo is in Mexico. Eladio is impressed with Nacho's plans to expand the Salamanca territory and gives his blessing.

Jimmy goes to Mike's house and demands that Mike explain why he has been aiding Jimmy. Mike reveals that Lalo will be killed that night, and Jimmy informs Kim. Still angered by Howard's comments, Kim proposes a forced resolution of the Sandpiper case by sabotaging him, which would enable Jimmy to receive his seven-figure share of the settlement sooner. (Note: As seen in "Fall".) Jimmy counsels against it, saying she would not be okay with it, but Kim asks "Wouldn't I?" and gives Jimmy finger guns. (Note: This is a reversal of the roles from the final scene of the fourth season finale "Winner", when Jimmy reveals to Kim he plans to practice law under the name "Saul Goodman" and gives her the same gesture as he walks off.)

Lalo is awake at 3 a.m., so Nacho sets a kitchen fire as a distraction that enables him to open the gate. Nacho flees as assassins enter and kill most of Lalo's family and guards. Lalo kills all but one assassin, then forces the survivor to call the middleman who arranged the attack call and report that Lalo was killed. Lalo realizes Nacho is missing and angrily strides away from his house.

== Production ==
Much of the fifth season was written to drive toward the final scene between Kim and Jimmy in which she appears ready to take vengeful action against Howard, showing that Kim has a side of her that is as conniving, if not more so than Jimmy's "Saul Goodman" persona. Bob Odenkirk, who portrays Jimmy, said, "The show, it's called Better Call Saul. But the real show is, Who the Hell is Kim?"; he identified the show had gone to lengths to show how similar Kim and Jimmy were even to their routines, and that Kim had elements of her past that suggested there was more to her than she presented. Rhea Seehorn, who plays Kim, said that "It isn't as simple as saying, 'Jimmy is turning [Kim] bad.' That’s not correct. So is he reigniting something that was always there? Is he bringing it out in her?"

Lalo's character was a focus of this episode. According to Tony Dalton, who plays Lalo, series co-creators Vince Gilligan and Peter Gould had not given much time to show the full breadth of Lalo's character outside of a few intense scenes such as when he confronts Fred, the clerk at the Travelwire store in "Winner". Within "Something Unforgivable" they gave Lalo this larger characterization, first showing him as a warm and charismatic person when introducing his family to Nacho on arrival at his home, then later as a ruthless killer when attacking the assassination team, particularly when he finds they killed his nana who may not have been a blood relative but who had taken care of Lalo. Dalton said that it took a couple of days to film the final attack scene, but in contrast to the final scene with Kim and Jimmy in "Bad Choice Road", the action scene was much easier and more fun to film.

== Reception ==
On Rotten Tomatoes, Something Unforgivable received an 100% rating with an average 8.86 out of 10 score based on 15 reviews. The critical consensus is, "Lalo lives to fight another day and Kim breaks bad in a season finale that masterfully assembles the board for Better Call Saul's doom-laden conclusion."

=== Ratings ===
Something Unforgivable was watched by 1.59 million viewers on its first broadcast. The episode was the second most-watched episode of the season, after the season premiere which had 1.60 million viewers.
