= Wiedersehen =

- Better Call Saul episode
- Episode no.: Season 4 Episode 9
- Directed by: Vince Gilligan
- Written by: Gennifer Hutchison
- Editing by: Skip Macdonald
- Original air date: October 1, 2018
- Running time: 56 minutes

Guest appearances
- Mark Margolis as Hector Salamanca; Rainer Bock as Werner Ziegler; Tony Dalton as Lalo Salamanca; Harrison Thomas as Lyle; Marceline Hugot as Shirley; Ray Campbell as Tyrus; Michael Lanahan as Committee Member; Ben Bela Böhm as Kai; Stefan Kapicic as Casper

Episode chronology
| ← Previous "Coushatta" | Next → "Winner" |
- Better Call Saul season 4

"Wiedersehen" (German for 'reunion', often used as a part of "goodbye"; pronounced [ˈviːdɐˌzeːən]) is the ninth and penultimate episode of the fourth season of the AMC television series Better Call Saul, a spinoff of Breaking Bad. The episode aired on October 1, 2018, on AMC in the United States. Outside of the United States, the episode premiered on Netflix.

== Plot ==
Jimmy McGill and Kim Wexler work a successful scam to replace approved building plans for a Mesa Verde branch in Lubbock, Texas with plans for a bigger building. On their way home, Jimmy suggests using their skills for more cons, but Kim counsels caution.

Lalo Salamanca and Nacho Varga visit Hector Salamanca, who is in a nursing home. Lalo reminds Hector of the time Hector burned down a hotel in Mexico and killed the owner, who had treated Hector disrespectfully. He reveals he kept a souvenir — the front desk concierge bell. He ties the bell to Hector's wheelchair, allowing Hector to communicate more effectively. Lalo takes Nacho to Los Pollos Hermanos so he can meet Gus Fring. Lalo thanks Gus for saving Hector's life, then asks Nacho to take him to Gus' chicken farm so he can see where the Salamancas receive their drugs after Gus' trucks bring them over the border.

Werner Ziegler's crew blasts the rock preventing construction of the meth lab's elevator, then celebrate because the end of their job is in sight. Werner asks permission to fly to Germany for a weekend with his wife, then come back to finish the work. Instead, Mike Ehrmantraut offers Werner an extra phone call with his wife, which Werner accepts.

After Jimmy's reinstatement hearing, he discovers that he has been denied because some of his answers were perceived as insincere, and that he can reapply in a year. An enraged Jimmy recounts the hearing to Kim, who points out that Jimmy never mentioned Chuck McGill; since their dispute caused Jimmy's suspension, the panel members considered his answers to be disingenuous. Jimmy complains that Kim only "slums" with him when she wants something, but Kim angrily responds that she has been Jimmy's biggest supporter since they first met. That night, Jimmy returns to Kim's apartment and wordlessly starts packing his belongings. Kim asks if he still wants to be a lawyer. He says yes, and Kim says she will help.

When Mike receives his report from the on-duty security team the next morning, he notices dead pixels in some camera feeds. He finds that Werner temporarily disabled the cameras with a laser, permitting him to move through the warehouse undetected, cut the padlocks for the doors leading to the roof, and escape by climbing down the building's maintenance ladder.

== Production ==
"Wiedersehen" includes the origin story for Hector Salamanca's bell, an iconic element of his character in both Better Call Saul and Breaking Bad. In addition, it provides some backstory for Lalo, who was mentioned once by name in Breaking Bad but first appeared in the Better Call Saul episode "Coushatta."

In German, "Wiedersehen" is literally translated as "seeing again", and the expression "auf Wiedersehen" is used to indicate "goodbye" or "farewell". In this episode, Werner's crew have spray painted the word "Wiedersehen" on the rock they need to blast to make room for the elevator in the underground meth lab, in effect saying "goodbye" to the obstacle that has put them behind schedule. "Wiedersehen" can also be understood as a reference to Werner's escape.

== Reception ==
"Wiedersehen" received critical acclaim. On Rotten Tomatoes, it garnered a perfect 100% rating with an average score of 9.5/10 based on 14 reviews. The site's critical consensus is, "A feeling of inevitability permeates 'Wiedersehen', a surprisingly mellow and melancholy penultimate episode beautifully realized by Vince Gilligan and Gennifer Hutchison's creative reunion."

=== Ratings ===
"Wiedersehen" was watched by 1.35 million viewers on its first broadcast, earning a 0.5 ratings for viewers between 18 and 49, holding steady with ratings from the previous week.
