= Bagman (Better Call Saul) =

- Better Call Saul episode
- Promotional poster
- Episode no.: Season 5 Episode 8
- Directed by: Vince Gilligan
- Written by: Gordon Smith
- Cinematography by: Marshall Adams
- Editing by: Skip Macdonald; Joey Reinisch
- Original air date: April 6, 2020
- Running time: 53 minutes

Guest appearances
- Daniel Moncada as Leonel Salamanca; Luis Moncada as Marco Salamanca

Episode chronology
← Previous "JMM"	Next → "Bad Choice Road"
- Better Call Saul season 5

"Bagman" is the eighth episode of the fifth season of the American crime drama television series Better Call Saul, the spinoff series of Breaking Bad. Written by Gordon Smith and directed by Vince Gilligan, the episode aired on April 6, 2020, on AMC in the United States. Outside of the United States, the episode premiered in several countries on Netflix.

In the episode, Jimmy McGill agrees to travel to the desert as a "bagman" to pick up the $7 million that will serve as bail money for Lalo Salamanca. While returning with the money, Jimmy finds himself in the middle of a shootout, where he is saved by Mike Ehrmantraut. Together, the pair begin their journey back to civilization, while Kim Wexler begins to get worried.

The episode's director, Gilligan, said that "Bagman" was one of the most challenging episodes he had to direct in his career. "Bagman" took 18 days to film, which was nine days more than average episodes, and was shot on location at the To'Hajiilee Navajo Chapter, with Marshall Adams serving as a cinematographer for the episode. Additionally, Daniel and Luis Moncada made guest appearances in the episode as the Cousins, Leonel and Marco Salamanca.

In its initial airing, "Bagman" was seen by 1.42 million viewers in the United States. The episode received universal acclaim from critics, who called it one of the best episodes of Better Call Saul. At the 72nd Primetime Emmy Awards, the episode received three nominations, for Outstanding Sound Editing, Outstanding Sound Mixing, and Outstanding Writing for a Drama Series.

== Plot ==
The Cousins arrive at a Mexican cartel site to pick up Lalo Salamanca's bail money. As they depart, an informant makes a telephone call to report their presence. Lalo gives Jimmy McGill directions to a remote desert pickup site. Jimmy reluctantly agrees to pick up the money in exchange for a $100,000 payment. Kim Wexler begs Jimmy not to go, saying he is an attorney, not a "bagman" for drug dealers, but he assures her that it will be easy and no one will suspect him of being the courier. The next morning, the Cousins deliver two duffel bags of cash to Jimmy at the pickup site.

Soon after Jimmy starts his return trip, several vehicles cut him off. Numerous gunmen exit, take the money, and prepare to kill him. The gunmen are suddenly attacked by an unknown shooter. All but one are killed, and their vehicles are disabled. The surviving gunman escapes in the only drivable vehicle. The unseen shooter was Mike Ehrmantraut, who was tracking Jimmy for Gus Fring. Mike finds his truck was also disabled in the shootout, so he places a still-shaken Jimmy and the money in Jimmy's car and begins driving back to Albuquerque. Jimmy's car soon breaks down. With no cell phone coverage and no vehicle, they push the car over the edge of the road and walk cross-country with the money in order to avoid the surviving gunman. As they camp overnight, Jimmy tells Mike that Kim knows of his work for Lalo; Mike warns Jimmy that if she knows details about the Salamancas, Kim is now "in the game". Jimmy and Mike resume their trek the following morning.

When Jimmy fails to return, Kim poses as Lalo's attorney to visit him in prison. He is initially furious, until she tells him she is Jimmy's wife and asks for his location so she can search. Lalo refuses and tells her Jimmy will be fine because he is a survivor. A dehydrated and sunburned Jimmy reaches his limit and collapses. Mike spots the surviving gunman, but rather than hide as Mike directs, Jimmy regains his motivation and walks onto the road to attract the gunman's attention. When the gunman is close enough, Mike shoots and kills him. The gunman's vehicle flips and is destroyed. Jimmy and Mike resume walking, this time on the road.

== Production ==
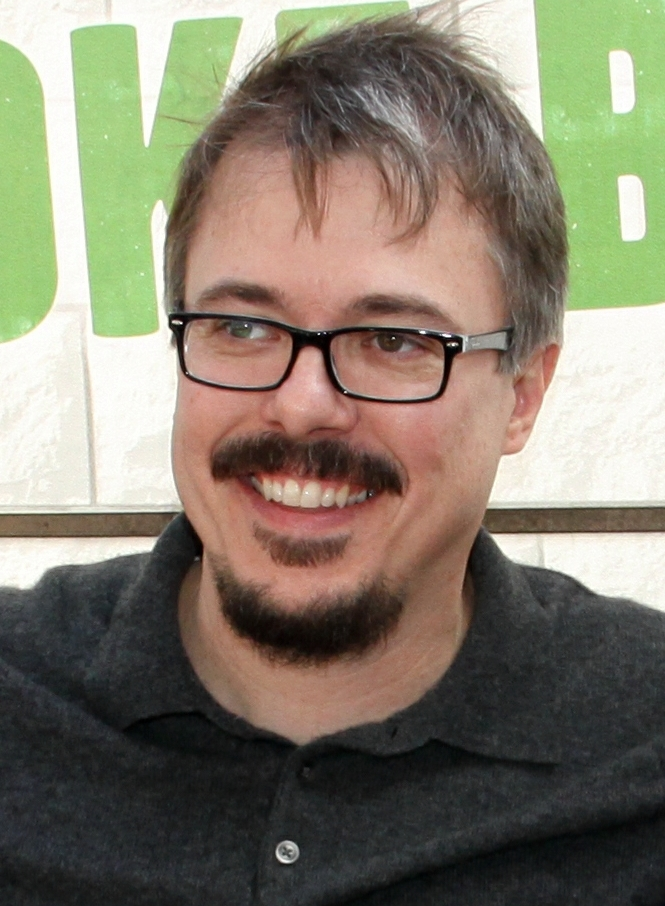
Series co-creator Vince Gilligan considered "Bagman" to be one of the most challenging episodes to direct in his career.

Vince Gilligan had made arrangements to direct one episode in the fifth season after completing post-production of El Camino: A Breaking Bad Movie. Both co-showrunner Peter Gould and writer Gordon Smith, knowing this would be Gilligan's episode, planned for his directorial skills and continually teased Gilligan that the episode was well-suited for him in the weeks prior to filming. They had compared the episode to Lawrence of Arabia in terms of how they wanted it to look, and even had considered renting out the lens used to film that movie, but were worried about the liability if they had damaged it.

The episode took 18 days to shoot, compared to the average of nine days for most other episodes. Most of the filming locations were on the To'hajiilee Indian Reservation, about an hour outside of Albuquerque by car, though the pickup location where Jimmy meets the Cousins was only about 15 minutes away from the Albuquerque studios. Gilligan credited his production team for making sure the cast and crew were protected from heat and had plenty of water to assure the shoot went on without any issues, despite temperatures over 100 °F. Bob Odenkirk made an effort to carry realistically heavy tote bags during filming, although not the full 150 pounds—75 pounds per bag—that they likely would have weighed in reality. Gilligan praised the script from Smith, which he felt established the bond between Mike and Jimmy that was seen in Breaking Bad but otherwise absent in Better Call Saul previously. Gilligan's associate producer Jenn Carroll and assistant Melissa Ng helped to identify elements to add to Smith's script to further connect the relationship between Mike and Jimmy to what was seen in Breaking Bad.

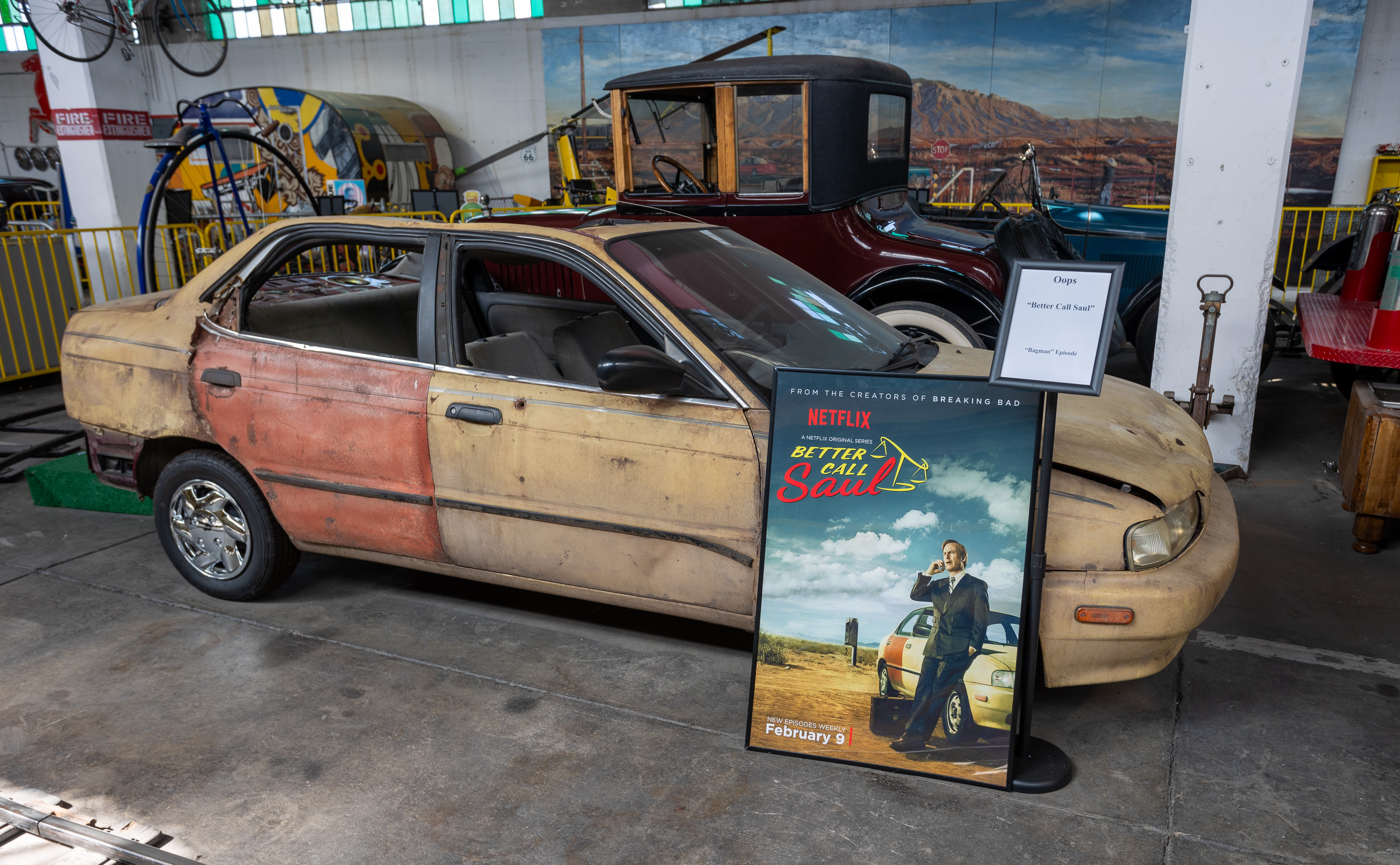
The shot-up Suzuki Esteem used in the episode, at the Albuquerque Wheels Museum in 2024

The shootout scene between Mike and the gunmen was a challenge for Gilligan, and he considered it "the most complicated single scene I've ever directed". He wanted to have Odenkirk visible in all shots, even while the stuntmen and practical effects were going off around him, as to show the shootout from Jimmy's point of view as much as possible. The overall sequence took about four to five days to complete. To film the scene with the flipping truck while Jimmy was in-shot, a temporary green screen was placed on site. Odenkirk's reaction in front of the screen was filmed first, followed by the truck flip without changing the camera's location after Odenkirk and the screen were removed. The Suzuki Esteem that had been shot up and pushed into a gully was a duplicate of the one they normally used in filming; the original was still kept at the local studios, allowing them to reuse it for any later flashback scenes as needed.

== Reception ==
=== Viewership ===
In its initial broadcast, "Bagman" was watched by 1.42 million viewers in the United States, ranking 29th amongst other American original cable telecasts that aired the same day, and gained a 0.32 rating from the Nielsen Media Research firm.

=== Critical response ===
"For a long time, the prequel series lacked an 'Ozymandias' – the Rian Johnson-directed, action-packed 60th episode of Breaking Bad ... 'Ozymandias' has been rightly heralded as a near-perfect mini-movie. And now, after five seasons, Better Call Saul has delivered an episode to rival Breaking Bad's best. What's more, Saul accomplished this remarkable feat without having to imitate its former series."

— Bradley Russell

"Bagman" received acclaim from critics, with many calling it one of the best episodes of the series. On Rotten Tomatoes, it received a 100% rating with an average 9.83 out of 10 score based on 13 reviews. The critical consensus is, "Jimmy undergoes a trial by gunfire in 'Bagman,' an unpredictable installment that is given blockbuster suspense by Vince Gilligan's direction." The episode, with numerous long takes with Jimmy and Mike in desert scenes, has been visually and thematically compared to Gilligan's previous works in both El Camino and the Breaking Bad episode "4 Days Out", as well as to the 2007 film No Country for Old Men.

Writing for Rolling Stone, Alan Sepinwall lauded the episode for its premise, cinematography, visuals, and acting, stating that "[Better Call Saul] can get hemmed in by the demands of being a prequel, particularly on the drug side of things, but its individual moments can feel even deeper and more artfully crafted." Steve Greene from IndieWire and Darren Franich of Entertainment Weekly both gave the episode a grade rating of an "A", with the pair praising the unpredictability of the episode as well as its visual style, and Franich calling it "a marvel to look at, scenes staged with sweaty-exquisite perfection". Nick Harley of Den of Geek gave the episode 5 out of 5 stars, who considered it to be one of the best of the series, especially praising Gilligan's direction. Kenny Herzog of Vulture also gave the episode 5 out of 5 stars, noting that Kim's decision to ask Lalo about Jimmy's whereabouts was a consequential decision that would cause her to be "in the game."

Donna Bowman of The A.V. Club gave the episode an "A" rating, praising the character developments of Saul and Kim, as well as the main desert sequences. David Segal, from The New York Times, lauded the episode's ending, stating that "It takes nerve and skill to tell a story as grueling as the one told in "Bagman". There is no end. At least there is no end to the suffering." On April 11, TVLine named Bob Odenkirk and Jonathan Banks the "Performers of the Week" for their performances in this episode.

=== Accolades ===
Awards and nominations received by "Bagman"
Award	Date of ceremony	Category	Nominee(s)	Result	Ref.
American Society of Cinematographers Awards	April 18, 2021	Outstanding Achievement in Cinematography in an Episode of a One-Hour Television Series – Commercial	Marshall Adams	Nominated	
Cinema Audio Society Awards	April 17, 2021	Outstanding Achievement in Sound Mixing for Television Series – One Hour	Phillip W. Palmer, Larry B. Benjamin, Kevin Valentine, Chris Navarro, and Stacey Michaels	Nominated	
Directors Guild of America Awards	April 10, 2021	Outstanding Directorial Achievement in Dramatic Series	Vince Gilligan	Nominated	
Golden Reel Awards	April 16, 2021	Outstanding Achievement in Sound Editing – Episodic Long Form – Effects / Foley	Nick Forshager, Kathryn Madsen, Todd Toon, Matt Temple, Jeff Cranford, Gregg Barbanell, and Alex Ulrich	Nominated	
Primetime Emmy Awards	September 20, 2020	Outstanding Writing for a Drama Series	Gordon Smith	Nominated	
Primetime Creative Arts Emmy Awards	September 14–17; 19, 2020	Outstanding Sound Editing for a Comedy or Drama Series (One Hour)	Nick Forshager, Kathryn Madsen, Matt Temple, Todd Toon, Jeff Cranford, Jane Boegel-Koch, Jason Tregoe Newman, Gregg Barbanell, and Alex Ullrich	Nominated	
Primetime Creative Arts Emmy Awards	September 14–17; 19, 2020	Outstanding Sound Mixing for a Comedy or Drama Series (One Hour)	Phillip W. Palmer, Larry Benjamin, and Kevin Valentine	Nominated	
