= Coushatta (Better Call Saul) =

- Better Call Saul episode
- Episode no.: Season 4 Episode 8
- Directed by: Jim McKay
- Written by: Gordon Smith
- Original air date: September 24, 2018
- Running time: 53 minutes

Guest appearances
- Rainer Bock as Werner Ziegler; Max Arciniega as Domingo Molina; Tony Dalton as Lalo Salamanca; Rex Linn as Kevin Wachtell; Cara Pifko as Paige Novick; Josh Fadem as Joey Dixon; Ethan Phillips as Benedict Munsinger; Eileen Fogarty as Mrs. Nguyen; Julie Pearl as Suzanne Ericsen; Tyson Turrou as Terry; Ben Bela Böhm as Kai; Stefan Kapicic as Casper; Hayley Holmes as The Make-Up Girl; KeiLyn Durrel Jones as Blingy; Katerina Tannenbaum as Amber; Erin Wilhelmi as Nikki

Episode chronology
← Previous "Something Stupid"	Next → "Wiedersehen"
- Better Call Saul season 4

"Coushatta" is the eighth episode of the fourth season of the AMC television series Better Call Saul, the spinoff series of Breaking Bad. The episode aired on September 24, 2018, on AMC in the United States. Outside of the United States, the episode premiered on the streaming service Netflix in several countries.

This episode marks the first appearance of Tony Dalton as Lalo Salamanca. Dalton would go on to be promoted to the main cast for the fifth season.

== Plot ==
Kim Wexler enlists Schweikart & Cokely employees to aid Huell Babineaux's defense and previews a plan to bury prosecutor Suzanne Ericsen in paperwork if she seeks a prison sentence. Jimmy McGill takes a bus to Huell's hometown, Coushatta, Louisiana. He and other passengers use Kim's office supplies (Note: As seen in "Something Stupid".) to write supportive mail for Huell.

When Judge Munsinger receives the mail, which has Coushatta postmarks, he insists that Suzanne and Kim reach a plea deal. Suzanne investigates, but Jimmy has arranged for pay-as-you-go cellular phones to receive Suzanne's calls, which he and his film crew answer with scripted lines that vouch for Huell as a hometown hero. As a result, Suzanne reluctantly makes a deal favorable to Huell.

Kim, Kevin Wachtell, and Paige Novick discuss Mesa Verde’s expansion. Kevin wants to change the building plans for an upcoming branch, but an uninterested Kim sides with Paige in dismissing the idea, as it would mean refiling the application, which would result in a delay. Later that day, Kim reminisces over the tequila bottle stopper she kept as a souvenir of a previous scam she ran with Jimmy. (Note: As seen in "Switch".) Jimmy scouts for new offices in anticipation of having his law license restored. Kim is elated by the success of their recent con and tells Jimmy she wants to do it again.

Mike Ehrmantraut arranges a strip club outing for Werner Ziegler and his crew. Mike and Werner head to a quieter bar, but Mike returns to the club to mediate after Kai causes an altercation. Back at the bar, a drunk Werner discusses with strangers the details of underground concrete construction. The next day, Mike explains that even though he did not expose details about the meth lab, the men Werner spoke to would likely remember him, making it possible to connect the lab to Gus Fring and him. Mike makes a veiled threat that Werner will be killed if he makes a similar mistake again, which Werner acknowledges. Mike informs Gus about Werner's bar conversation and assures Gus he is keeping a watchful eye on Werner.

Nacho Varga has recovered from his wounds and has a more prominent role in the Salamanca organization, but also stashes cash and fake Canadian identification cards for himself and his father. During weekly collections, Nacho trains Domingo Molina to handle dealers short in their payments the same way Hector taught Nacho to do when Domingo was short. (Note: As seen in "Off Brand".) Eduardo "Lalo" Salamanca then arrives to aid in running the business. Unlike Hector, who was unconcerned with day-to-day details, Lalo is interested in every aspect, which worries Nacho.

== Production ==
This episode marks the first on-screen appearance of the character Lalo, portrayed by Tony Dalton. The character was first mentioned in the Breaking Bad episode "Better Call Saul," which also referenced the character "Ignacio" (Nacho) and introduced the character of Saul Goodman. Prior to the show's airing, Vince Gilligan mentioned in an interview that the writers had envisioned Lalo to become a major character, acknowledging that, like on Breaking Bad, they must "keep close tabs on what our characters have done in the past and make good use of it here in the present and the future." In an interview with Den of Geek, actor Michael Mando described the character of Lalo as "a Salamanca in every way, just like Tuco and Hector had their own flavors to the erratic Salamancas."

== Reception ==
"Coushatta" received critical acclaim. On Rotten Tomatoes, it garnered a perfect 100% rating with an average score of 9.28/10 based on 13 reviews. The site's critical consensus is, "'Coushatta' sensitively highlights the aches of relationships, most effectively accentuating Jimmy and Kim's uneasy arc."

Regarding Dalton's debut performance as Lalo, Alan Sepinwall of Rolling Stone said he "makes a solid first impression in the role, so hopefully this will turn out to be more than filling in a blank most viewers had long since forgotten existed."

=== Ratings ===
"Coushatta" was watched by 1.37 million viewers on its first broadcast, earning a 0.5 ratings for viewers between 18 and 49, which was an increase from the previous week.
