= 72nd Primetime Emmy Awards =

2020 American television programming awards

- Promotional poster
- Date: September 20, 2020 (Ceremony); September 14–17 & 19, 2020 (Creative Arts Emmys)
- Location: Staples Center; Los Angeles, California (Note: Winners and nominees attended from other locations.)
- Presented by: Academy of Television Arts & Sciences
- Hosted by: Jimmy Kimmel

Highlights
- Most awards: Major: Schitt's Creek (7); All: Watchmen (11)
- Most nominations: Major: Watchmen (11); All: Watchmen (26)
- Comedy Series: Schitt's Creek
- Drama Series: Succession
- Limited Series: Watchmen

Television/radio coverage
- Network: ABC
- Runtime: 3 hours, 6 minutes
- Viewership: 6.36 million
- Produced by: Done and Dusted; Hudlin Entertainment; Kimmelot
- Directed by: Hamish Hamilton

The 72nd Primetime Emmy Awards honored the best in American prime time television programming from June 1, 2019, until May 31, 2020, as chosen by the Academy of Television Arts & Sciences. The ceremony was originally to be held at the Microsoft Theater in Los Angeles, California, but due to the COVID-19 pandemic, it was instead hosted from the Staples Center, while winners gave speeches remotely from their homes or other locations. It aired live on September 20, 2020, following the 72nd Primetime Creative Arts Emmy Awards on September 14–17 and 19. During the ceremony, Emmy Awards were handed out in 23 categories. The ceremony was produced by Done and Dusted, directed by Hamish Hamilton, and broadcast in the United States by ABC. Jimmy Kimmel served as host for the third time.

At the main ceremony, Schitt's Creek won all seven comedy categories including Outstanding Comedy Series, becoming the first comedy series to complete a sweep of those categories. Succession and Watchmen each won four awards, including Outstanding Drama Series and Outstanding Limited Series, respectively. Other winning programs include Euphoria, I Know This Much Is True, Last Week Tonight with John Oliver, The Morning Show, Mrs. America, Ozark, RuPaul's Drag Race, and Unorthodox. Including Creative Arts Emmys, Watchmen led all programs with 11 wins and 26 nominations, while HBO took home 30 awards to lead all networks.

== Winners and nominees ==
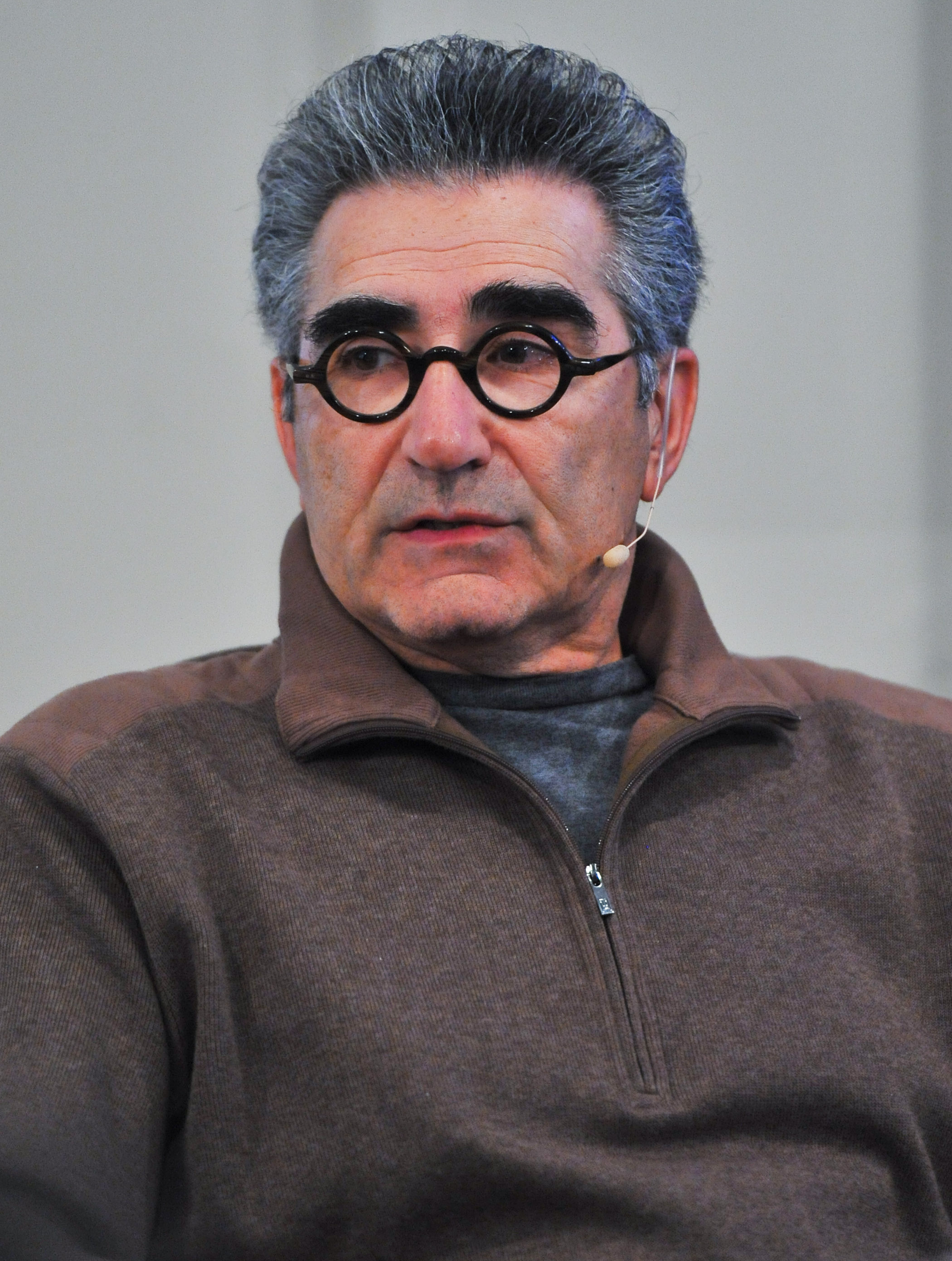
Eugene Levy, Outstanding Lead Actor in a Comedy Series winner

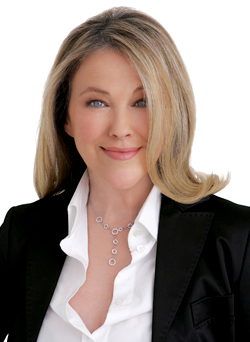
Catherine O'Hara, Outstanding Lead Actress in a Comedy Series winner

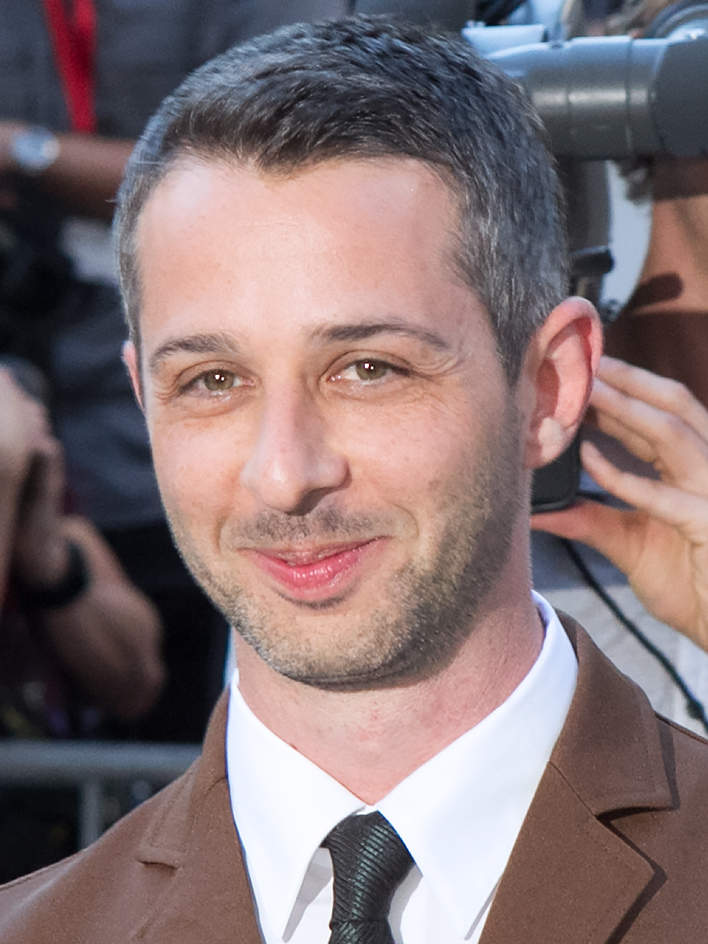
Jeremy Strong, Outstanding Lead Actor in a Drama Series winner

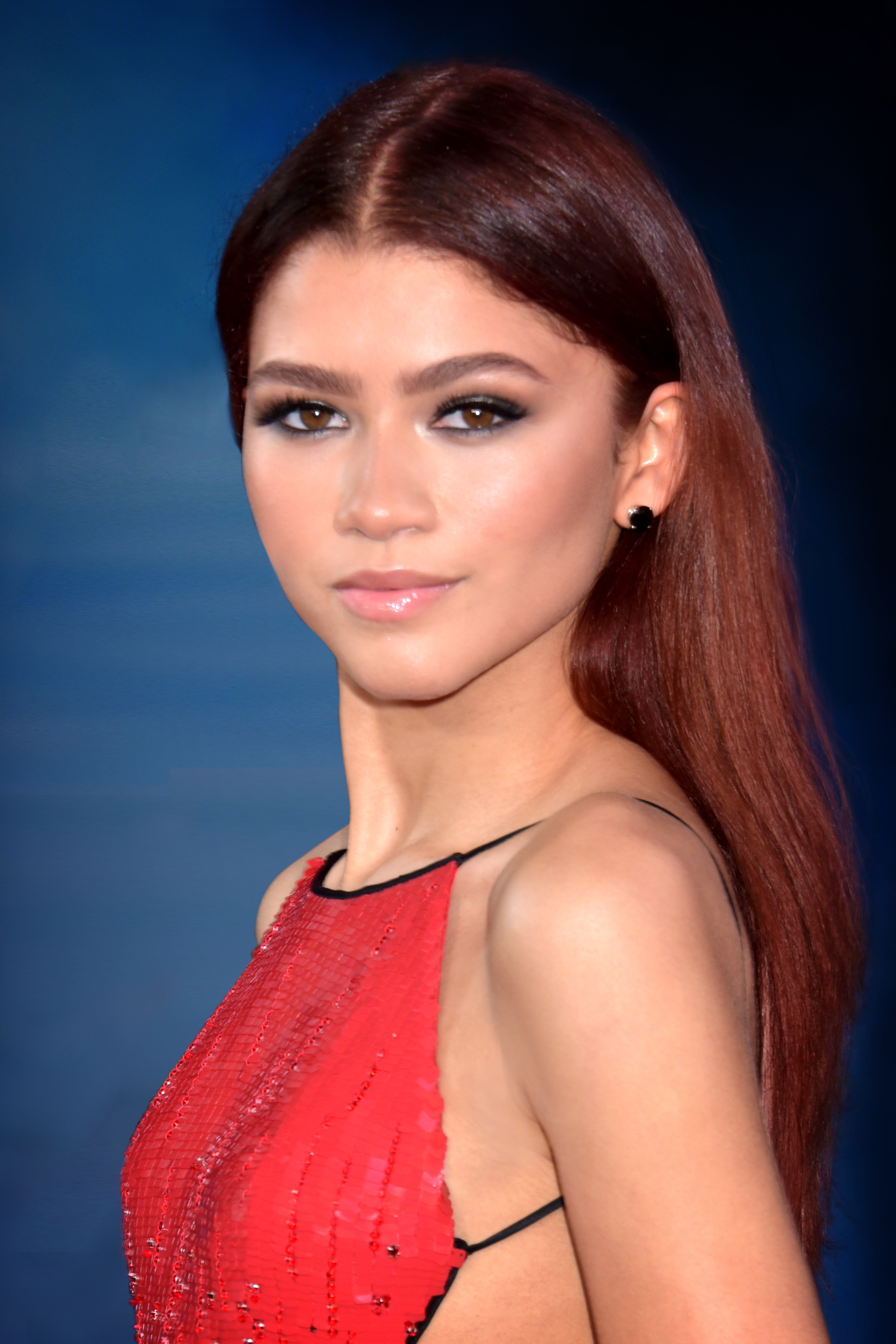
Zendaya, Outstanding Lead Actress in a Drama Series winner

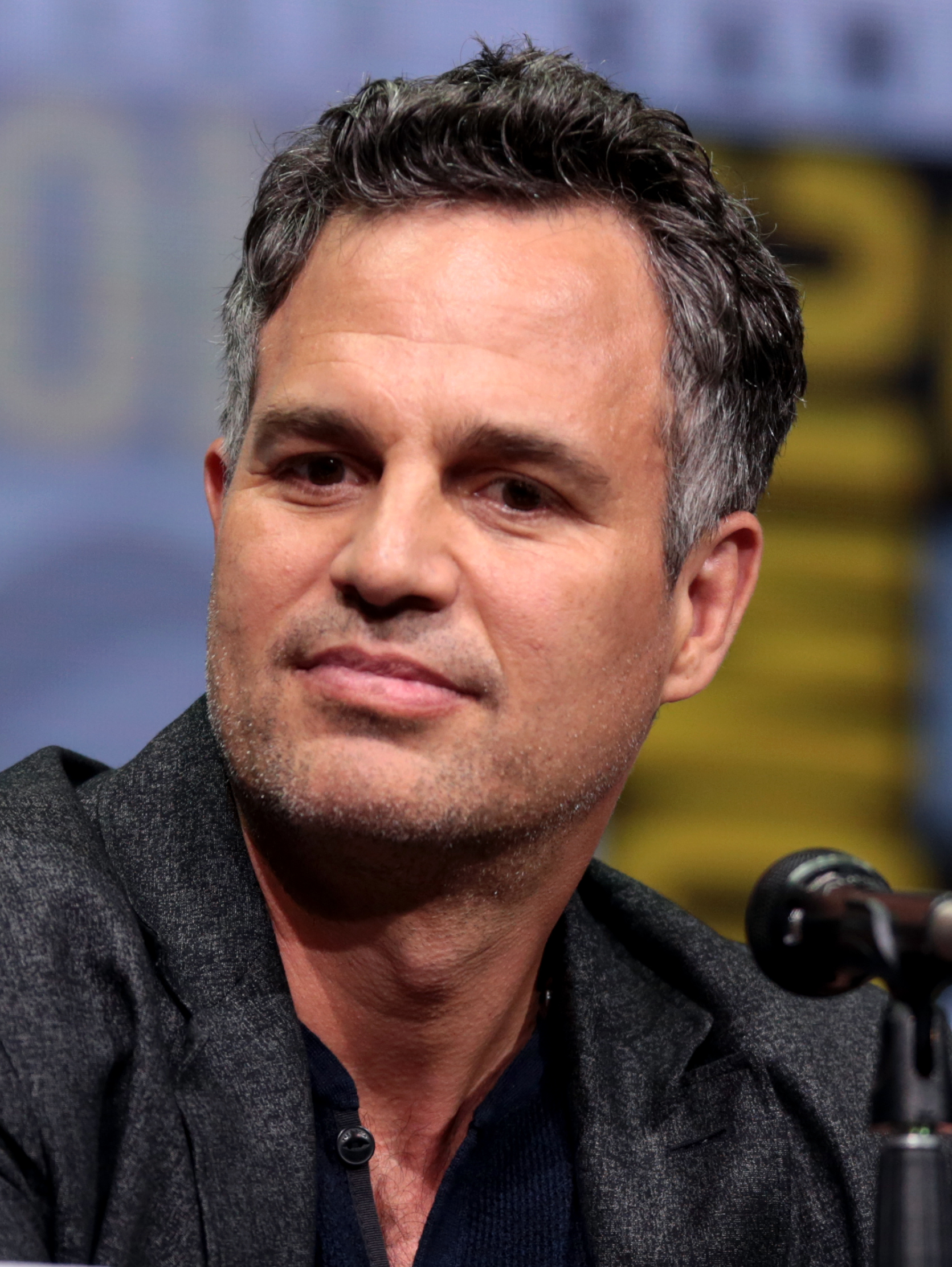
Mark Ruffalo, Outstanding Lead Actor in a Limited Series or Movie winner

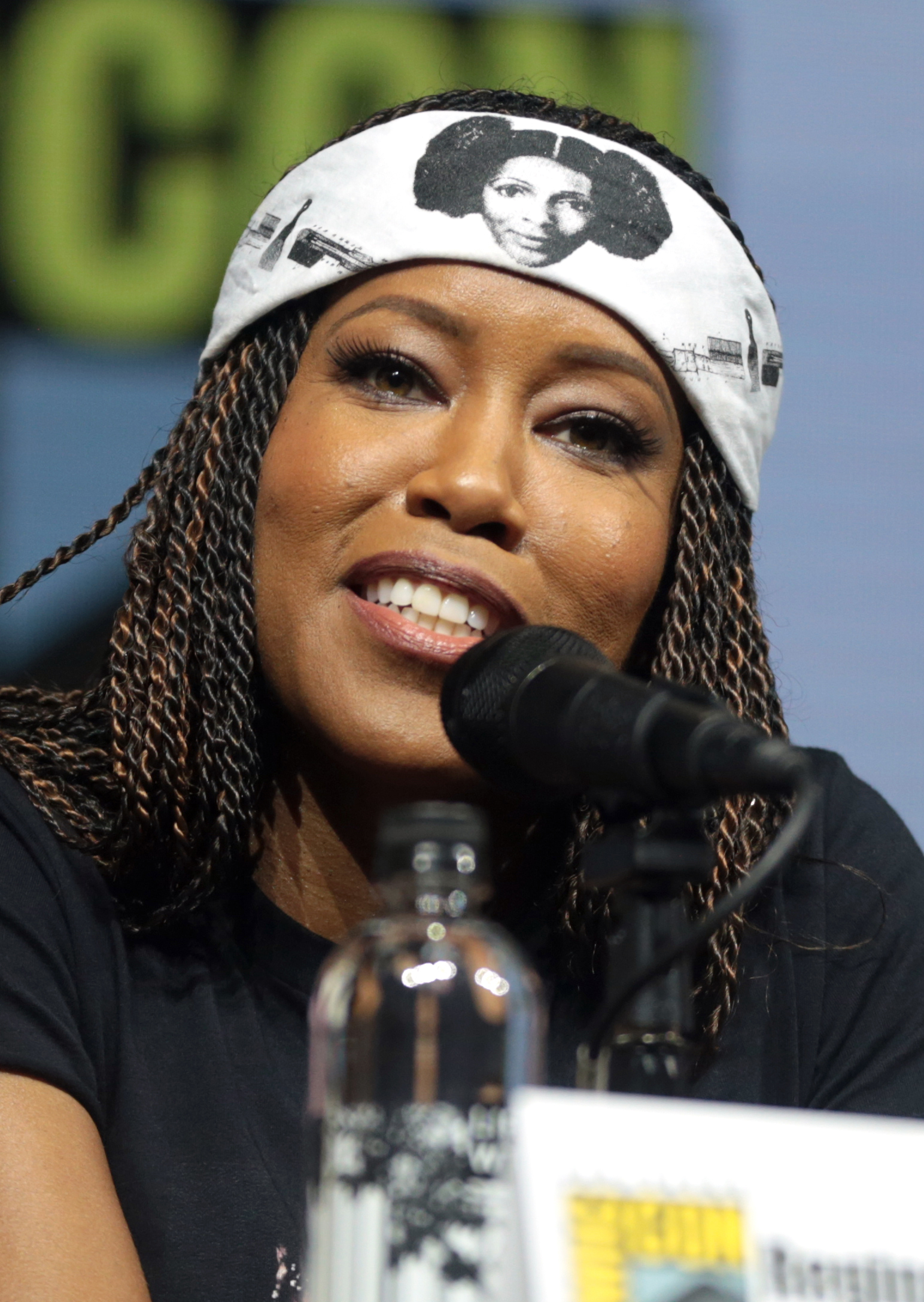
Regina King, Outstanding Lead Actress in a Limited Series or Movie winner

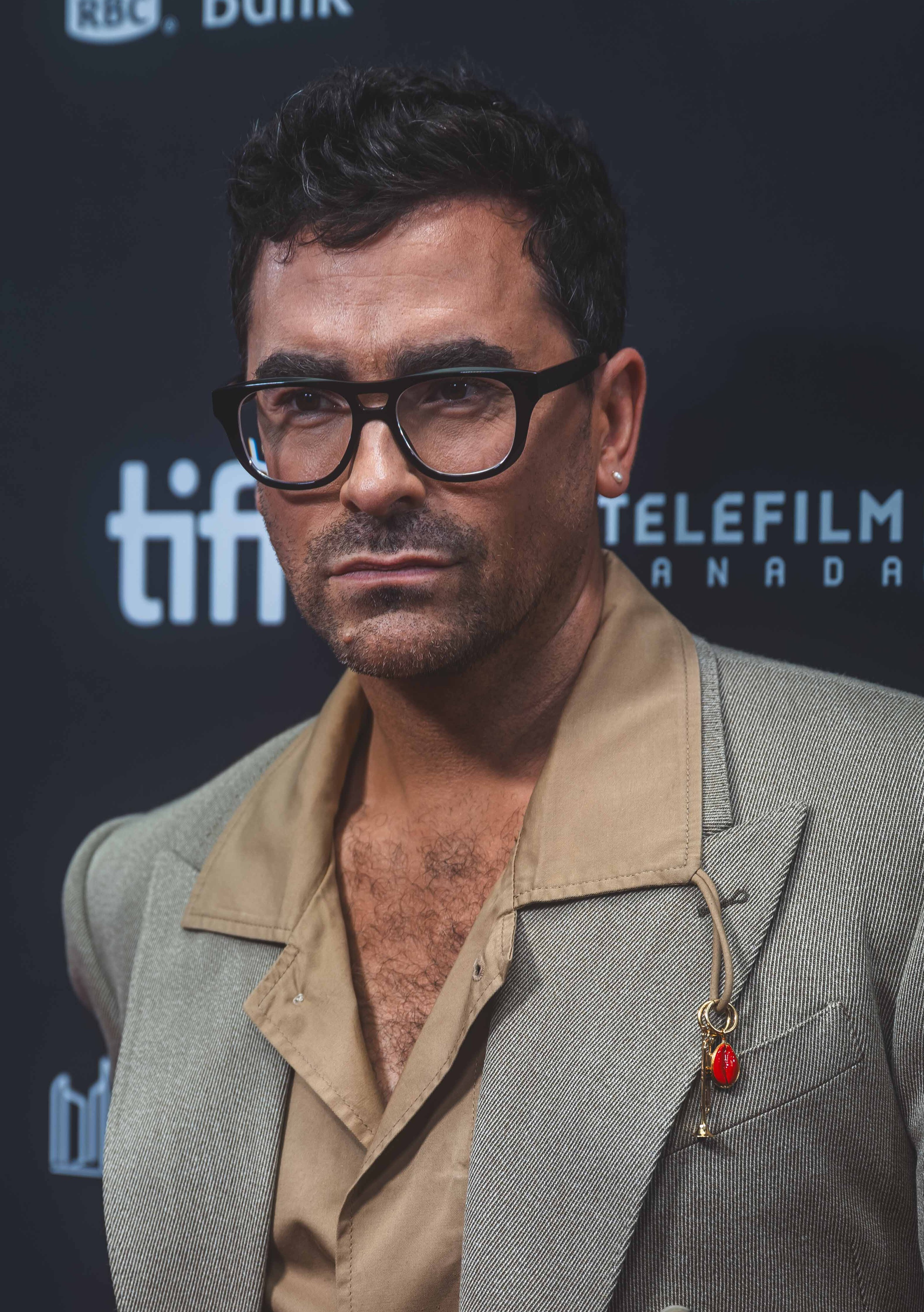
Dan Levy, Outstanding Supporting Actor in a Comedy Series winner

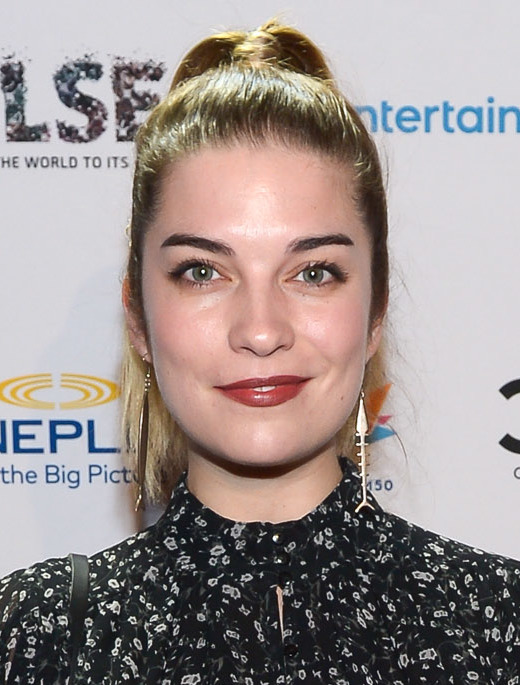
Annie Murphy, Outstanding Supporting Actress in a Comedy Series winner

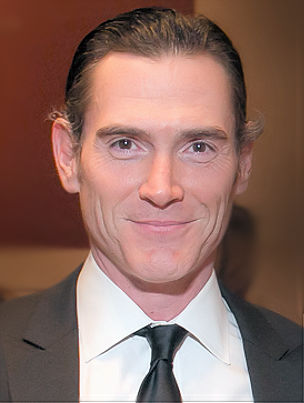
Billy Crudup, Outstanding Supporting Actor in a Drama Series winner

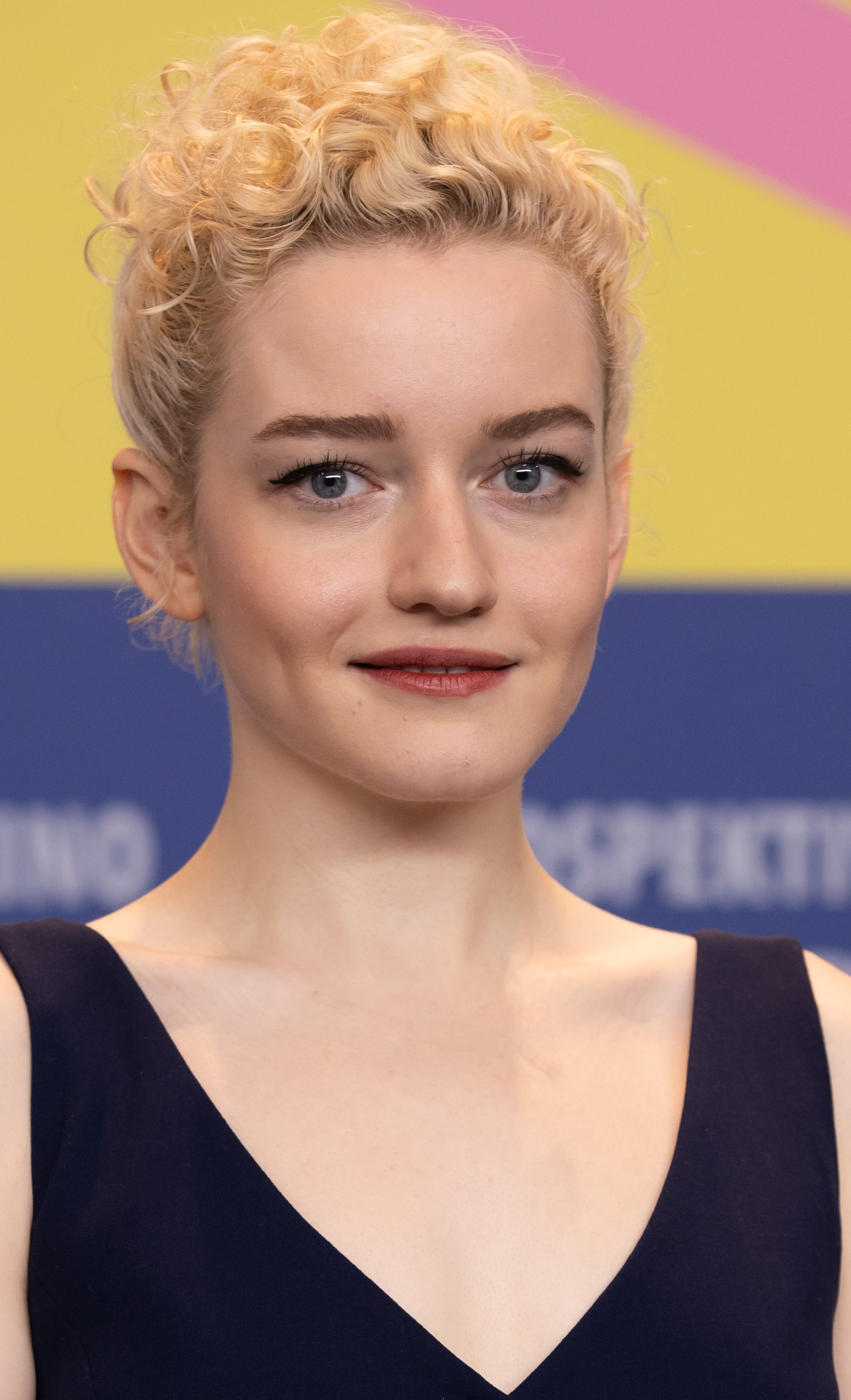
Julia Garner, Outstanding Supporting Actress in a Drama Series winner

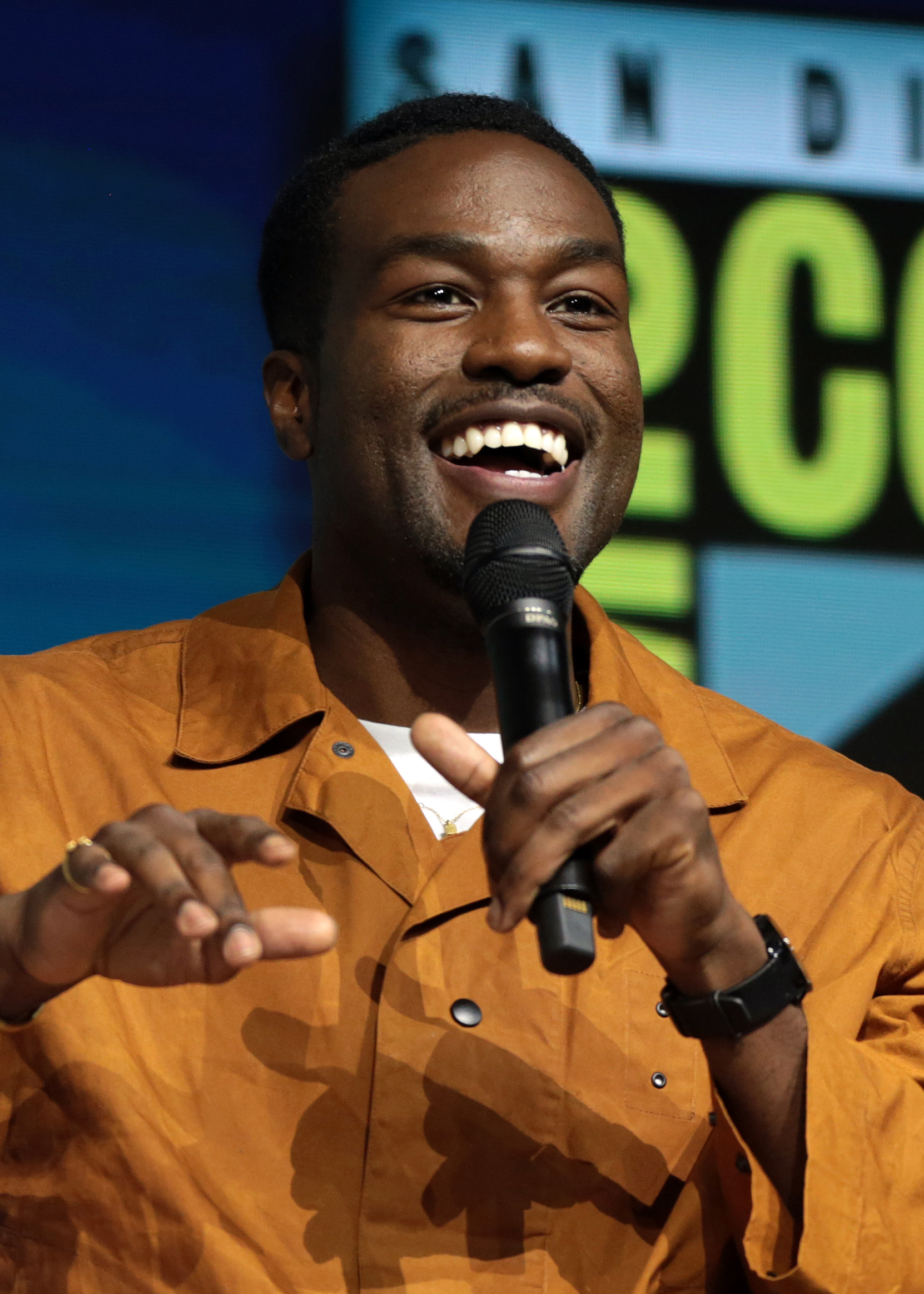
Yahya Abdul-Mateen II, Outstanding Supporting Actor in a Limited Series or Movie winner

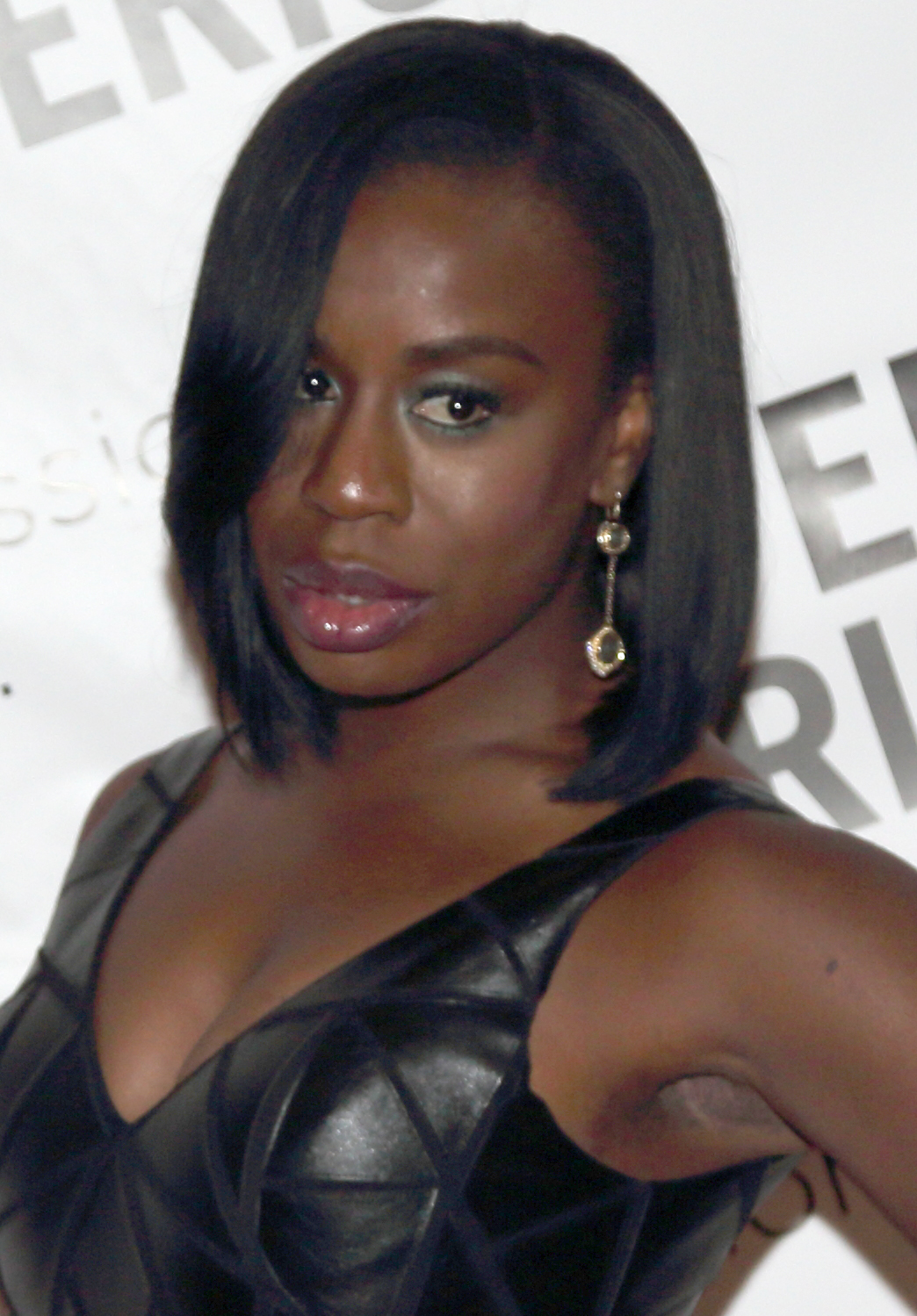
Uzo Aduba, Outstanding Supporting Actress in a Limited Series or Movie winner

The nominations for the 72nd Primetime Emmy Awards were announced on July 28, 2020, by host Leslie Jones and presenters Laverne Cox, Josh Gad, and Tatiana Maslany. Watchmen led all programs with 26 total nominations between the main ceremony and the 72nd Primetime Creative Arts Emmy Awards, followed by The Marvelous Mrs. Maisel with 20 and Ozark and Succession with 18 each. Netflix led all networks and platforms with 160 nominations, beating the record of 137 set by HBO the previous year. Disney+, Apple TV+, and Quibi all received their first Emmy nominations and wins this year.

The winners were announced on September 20. Schitt's Creek became the first series to sweep all seven comedy categories and the second to ever complete a sweep, following Angels in America as a miniseries in 2004. It also became the first Canadian program to win the overall comedy or drama series award and set a record for most Emmys for a Canadian series. Additionally, it became the first comedy series to win all four main acting categories in a single year and the first show overall to sweep the acting categories since Angels in America. Combined with its two Creative Arts Emmys, the show became the most awarded comedy in a single year with nine wins, breaking The Marvelous Mrs. Maisel's record of eight from 2018 and 2019.

Dan Levy won four awards for Schitt's Creek to tie Moira Demos and Amy Sherman-Palladino for the most wins for an individual in one year, while he and Eugene Levy became the first father-son duo to win Emmys in the same year. For her work on Euphoria, Zendaya became the youngest winner in the Lead Actress in a Drama Series category at 24 years old, breaking Jodie Comer's record from the previous year. She also became the second black actress to win the category, following Viola Davis in 2015. Regina King's win for her performance in Watchmen marked her fourth career Emmy, tying her with Alfre Woodard for the most wins by a black performer. Zendaya and King were also two of the seven black winners for acting in comedy, drama, or limited series, breaking the record of six.

Winners are listed first, highlighted in boldface, and indicated with a double dagger (‡). (Note: The outlets listed for each program are the U.S. broadcasters or streaming services identified in the nominations, which for some international productions are different from the broadcaster(s) that originally commissioned the program.) For simplicity, producers who received nominations for program awards have been omitted.

=== Programs ===
Programs
**Outstanding Comedy Series**: **Schitt's Creek (Pop TV)**‡; Curb Your Enthusiasm (HBO); Dead to Me (Netflix); The Good Place (NBC); Insecure (HBO); The Kominsky Method (Netflix); The Marvelous Mrs. Maisel (Prime Video); What We Do in the Shadows (FX)	**Outstanding Drama Series**: **Succession (HBO)**‡; Better Call Saul (AMC); The Crown (Netflix); The Handmaid's Tale (Hulu); Killing Eve (BBC America); The Mandalorian (Disney+); Ozark (Netflix); Stranger Things (Netflix)
**Outstanding Limited Series**: **Watchmen (HBO)**‡; Little Fires Everywhere (Hulu); Mrs. America (FX on Hulu); Unbelievable (Netflix); Unorthodox (Netflix)	**Outstanding Variety Talk Series**: **Last Week Tonight with John Oliver (HBO)**‡; The Daily Show with Trevor Noah (Comedy Central); Full Frontal with Samantha Bee (TBS); Jimmy Kimmel Live! (ABC); The Late Show with Stephen Colbert (CBS)
**Outstanding Competition Program**: **RuPaul's Drag Race (VH1)**‡; The Masked Singer (Fox); Nailed It! (Netflix); Top Chef (Bravo); The Voice (NBC)

=== Acting ===
==== Lead performances ====
Lead performances
**Outstanding Lead Actor in a Comedy Series**: **Eugene Levy – Schitt's Creek as Johnny Rose (Pop TV)**‡; Anthony Anderson – Black-ish as Andre "Dre" Johnson Sr. (ABC); Don Cheadle – Black Monday as Mo Monroe (Showtime); Ted Danson – The Good Place as Michael (NBC); Michael Douglas – The Kominsky Method as Sandy Kominsky (Netflix); Ramy Youssef – Ramy as Ramy (Hulu)	**Outstanding Lead Actress in a Comedy Series**: **Catherine O'Hara – Schitt's Creek as Moira Rose (Pop TV)**‡; Christina Applegate – Dead to Me as Jen Harding (Netflix); Rachel Brosnahan – The Marvelous Mrs. Maisel as Miriam "Midge" Maisel (Prime Video); Linda Cardellini – Dead to Me as Judy Hale (Netflix); Issa Rae – Insecure as Issa (HBO); Tracee Ellis Ross – Black-ish as Rainbow Johnson (ABC)
**Outstanding Lead Actor in a Drama Series**: **Jeremy Strong – Succession as Kendall Roy (HBO)**‡; Jason Bateman – Ozark as Martin "Marty" Byrde (Netflix); Sterling K. Brown – This Is Us as Randall Pearson (NBC); Steve Carell – The Morning Show as Mitch Kessler (Apple TV+); Brian Cox – Succession as Logan Roy (HBO); Billy Porter – Pose as Pray Tell (FX)	**Outstanding Lead Actress in a Drama Series**: **Zendaya – Euphoria as Rue (HBO)**‡; Jennifer Aniston – The Morning Show as Alex Levy (Apple TV+); Olivia Colman – The Crown as Queen Elizabeth II (Netflix); Jodie Comer – Killing Eve as Villanelle (BBC America); Laura Linney – Ozark as Wendy Byrde (Netflix); Sandra Oh – Killing Eve as Eve Polastri (BBC America)
**Outstanding Lead Actor in a Limited Series or Movie**: **Mark Ruffalo – I Know This Much Is True as Dominick and Thomas Birdsey (HBO)**‡; Jeremy Irons – Watchmen as Adrian Veidt / Ozymandias (HBO); Hugh Jackman – Bad Education as Frank Tassone (HBO); Paul Mescal – Normal People as Connell (Hulu); Jeremy Pope – Hollywood as Archie Coleman (Netflix)	**Outstanding Lead Actress in a Limited Series or Movie**: **Regina King – Watchmen as Angela Abar / Sister Night (HBO)**‡; Cate Blanchett – Mrs. America as Phyllis Schlafly (FX on Hulu); Shira Haas – Unorthodox as Esther Shapiro (Netflix); Octavia Spencer – Self Made as Madam C. J. Walker (Netflix); Kerry Washington – Little Fires Everywhere as Mia Warren (Hulu)

==== Supporting performances ====
Supporting performances
**Outstanding Supporting Actor in a Comedy Series**: **Dan Levy – Schitt's Creek as David Rose (Pop TV)**‡; Mahershala Ali – Ramy as Sheikh Malik (Hulu); Alan Arkin – The Kominsky Method as Norman Newlander (Netflix); Andre Braugher – Brooklyn Nine-Nine as Captain Raymond Holt (NBC); Sterling K. Brown – The Marvelous Mrs. Maisel as Reggie (Prime Video); William Jackson Harper – The Good Place as Chidi Anagonye (NBC); Tony Shalhoub – The Marvelous Mrs. Maisel as Abe Weissman (Prime Video); Kenan Thompson – Saturday Night Live as various characters (NBC)	**Outstanding Supporting Actress in a Comedy Series**: **Annie Murphy – Schitt's Creek as Alexis Rose (Pop TV)**‡; Alex Borstein – The Marvelous Mrs. Maisel as Susie Myerson (Prime Video); D'Arcy Carden – The Good Place as Janet (NBC); Betty Gilpin – GLOW as Debbie Eagan (Netflix); Marin Hinkle – The Marvelous Mrs. Maisel as Rose Weissman (Prime Video); Kate McKinnon – Saturday Night Live as various characters (NBC); Yvonne Orji – Insecure as Molly (HBO); Cecily Strong – Saturday Night Live as various characters (NBC)
**Outstanding Supporting Actor in a Drama Series**: **Billy Crudup – The Morning Show as Cory Ellison (Apple TV+)**‡; Nicholas Braun – Succession as Greg Hirsch (HBO); Kieran Culkin – Succession as Roman Roy (HBO); Mark Duplass – The Morning Show as Charles "Chip" Black (Apple TV+); Giancarlo Esposito – Better Call Saul as Gus Fring (AMC); Matthew Macfadyen – Succession as Tom Wambsgans (HBO); Bradley Whitford – The Handmaid's Tale as Commander Joseph Lawrence (Hulu); Jeffrey Wright – Westworld as Bernard (HBO)	**Outstanding Supporting Actress in a Drama Series**: **Julia Garner – Ozark as Ruth Langmore (Netflix)**‡; Helena Bonham Carter – The Crown as Princess Margaret (Netflix); Laura Dern – Big Little Lies as Renata Klein (HBO); Thandie Newton – Westworld as Maeve (HBO); Fiona Shaw – Killing Eve as Carolyn Martens (BBC America); Sarah Snook – Succession as Shiv Roy (HBO); Meryl Streep – Big Little Lies as Mary Louise Wright (HBO); Samira Wiley – The Handmaid's Tale as Moira (Hulu)
**Outstanding Supporting Actor in a Limited Series or Movie**: **Yahya Abdul-Mateen II – Watchmen as Cal Abar / Dr. Manhattan (HBO)**‡; Jovan Adepo – Watchmen as Officer Will Reeves / Hooded Justice (HBO); Tituss Burgess – Unbreakable Kimmy Schmidt: Kimmy vs the Reverend as Titus Andromedon (Netflix); Louis Gossett Jr. – Watchmen as William Reeves (HBO); Dylan McDermott – Hollywood as Ernie (Netflix); Jim Parsons – Hollywood as Henry Willson (Netflix)	**Outstanding Supporting Actress in a Limited Series or Movie**: **Uzo Aduba – Mrs. America as Shirley Chisholm (FX on Hulu)**‡; Toni Collette – Unbelievable as Det. Grace Rasmussen (Netflix); Margo Martindale – Mrs. America as Bella Abzug (FX on Hulu); Jean Smart – Watchmen as Agent Laurie Blake (HBO); Holland Taylor – Hollywood as Miss Kincaid (Netflix); Tracey Ullman – Mrs. America as Betty Friedan (FX on Hulu)

=== Directing ===
Directing
**Outstanding Directing for a Comedy Series**: **Schitt's Creek: "Happy Ending" – Andrew Cividino and Dan Levy (Pop TV)**‡; The Great: "The Great" – Matt Shakman (Hulu); The Marvelous Mrs. Maisel: "It's Comedy or Cabbage" – Amy Sherman-Palladino (Prime Video); The Marvelous Mrs. Maisel: "Marvelous Radio" – Daniel Palladino (Prime Video); Modern Family: "Finale, Part 2" – Gail Mancuso (ABC); Ramy: "Miakhalifa.mov" – Ramy Youssef (Hulu); Will & Grace: "We Love Lucy" – James Burrows (NBC)	**Outstanding Directing for a Drama Series**: **Succession: "Hunting" – Andrij Parekh (HBO)**‡; The Crown: "Aberfan" – Benjamin Caron (Netflix); The Crown: "Cri de Coeur" – Jessica Hobbs (Netflix); Homeland: "Prisoners of War" – Lesli Linka Glatter (Showtime); The Morning Show: "The Interview" – Mimi Leder (Apple TV+); Ozark: "Fire Pink" – Alik Sakharov (Netflix); Ozark: "Su Casa Es Mi Casa" – Ben Semanoff (Netflix); Succession: "This Is Not for Tears" – Mark Mylod (HBO)
**Outstanding Directing for a Limited Series, Movie or Dramatic Special**: **Unorthodox – Maria Schrader (Netflix)**‡; Little Fires Everywhere: "Find a Way" – Lynn Shelton (Hulu) (posthumous); Normal People: "Episode 5" – Lenny Abrahamson (Hulu); Watchmen: "It's Summer and We're Running Out of Ice" – Nicole Kassell (HBO); Watchmen: "Little Fear of Lightning" – Steph Green (HBO); Watchmen: "This Extraordinary Being" – Stephen Williams (HBO)

=== Writing ===
Writing
**Outstanding Writing for a Comedy Series**: **Schitt's Creek: "Happy Ending" – Dan Levy (Pop TV)**‡; The Good Place: "Whenever You're Ready" – Michael Schur (NBC); The Great: "The Great" – Tony McNamara (Hulu); Schitt's Creek: "The Presidential Suite" – David West Read (Pop TV); What We Do in the Shadows: "Collaboration" – Sam Johnson and Chris Marcil (FX); What We Do in the Shadows: "Ghosts" – Paul Simms (FX); What We Do in the Shadows: "On the Run" – Stefani Robinson (FX)	**Outstanding Writing for a Drama Series**: **Succession: "This Is Not for Tears" – Jesse Armstrong (HBO)**‡; Better Call Saul: "Bad Choice Road" – Thomas Schnauz (AMC); Better Call Saul: "Bagman" – Gordon Smith (AMC); The Crown: "Aberfan" – Peter Morgan (Netflix); Ozark: "All In" – Chris Mundy (Netflix); Ozark: "Boss Fight" – John Shiban (Netflix); Ozark: "Fire Pink" – Miki Johnson (Netflix)
**Outstanding Writing for a Limited Series, Movie or Dramatic Special**: **Watchmen: "This Extraordinary Being" – Damon Lindelof and Cord Jefferson (HBO)**‡; Mrs. America: "Shirley" – Tanya Barfield (FX on Hulu); Normal People: "Episode 3" – Sally Rooney and Alice Birch (Hulu); Unbelievable: "Episode 1" – Susannah Grant, Michael Chabon, and Ayelet Waldman (Netflix); Unorthodox: "Part 1" – Anna Winger (Netflix)

=== Governors Award ===
The Governors Award was presented to Tyler Perry and The Perry Foundation "in recognition of their unparalleled contributions to shaping the television medium" and for their "inclusion, engagement, employment and other philanthropic initiatives". The award was moved to the main telecast from its usual presentation at the Creative Arts Emmys.

=== Nominations and wins by program ===
For the purposes of the lists below, "major" constitutes the categories listed above (program, acting, directing, and writing), while "total" includes the categories presented at the Creative Arts Emmy Awards.

Shows with multiple major nominations
Nominations	Show	Network
11	Watchmen	HBO
10	Succession	HBO
9	Ozark	Netflix
8	The Marvelous Mrs. Maisel	Prime Video
8	Schitt's Creek	Pop TV
6	The Crown	Netflix
6	Mrs. America	FX on Hulu
5	The Good Place	NBC
5	The Morning Show	Apple TV+
4	Better Call Saul	AMC
4	Hollywood	Netflix
4	Killing Eve	BBC America
4	Unorthodox	Netflix
4	What We Do in the Shadows	FX
3	Dead to Me	Netflix
3	The Handmaid's Tale	Hulu
3	Insecure	HBO
3	The Kominsky Method	Netflix
3	Little Fires Everywhere	Hulu
3	Normal People	Hulu
3	Ramy	Hulu
3	Saturday Night Live	NBC
3	Unbelievable	Netflix
2	Big Little Lies	HBO
2	Black-ish	ABC
2	The Great	Hulu
2	Westworld	HBO

Shows with five or more total nominations
Nominations	Show	Network
26	Watchmen	HBO
20	The Marvelous Mrs. Maisel	Prime Video
18	Ozark	Netflix
18	Succession	HBO
15	The Mandalorian	Disney+
15	Saturday Night Live	NBC
15	Schitt's Creek	Pop TV
13	The Crown	Netflix
12	Hollywood	Netflix
11	Westworld	HBO
10	The Handmaid's Tale	Hulu
10	Mrs. America	FX on Hulu
10	RuPaul's Drag Race	VH1
9	Last Week Tonight with John Oliver	HBO
9	The Oscars	ABC
8	Insecure	HBO
8	Killing Eve	BBC America
8	The Morning Show	Apple TV+
8	Stranger Things	Netflix
8	Unorthodox	Netflix
8	What We Do in the Shadows	FX
7	Better Call Saul	AMC
7	Queer Eye	Netflix
6	Cheer	Netflix
6	Dave Chappelle: Sticks & Stones	Netflix
6	Euphoria	HBO
6	The Good Place	NBC
6	Tiger King: Murder, Mayhem and Madness	Netflix
6	The Voice	NBC
5	Apollo 11	CNN
5	Beastie Boys Story	Apple TV+
5	Big Little Lies	HBO
5	The Daily Show with Trevor Noah	Comedy Central
5	Little Fires Everywhere	Hulu
5	McMillion$	HBO
5	The Politician	Netflix
5	Pose	FX
5	Star Trek: Picard	CBS All Access
5	This Is Us	NBC
5	Will & Grace	NBC

Shows with multiple major wins
Wins	Show	Network
7	Schitt's Creek	Pop TV
4	Succession	HBO
4	Watchmen	HBO

Shows with multiple total wins
Wins	Show	Network
11	Watchmen	HBO
9	Schitt's Creek	Pop TV
7	Succession	HBO
7	The Mandalorian	Disney+
6	RuPaul's Drag Race	VH1
6	Saturday Night Live	NBC
4	Last Week Tonight with John Oliver	HBO
4	The Marvelous Mrs. Maisel	Prime Video
3	Apollo 11	CNN
3	Cheer	Netflix
3	Dave Chappelle: Sticks & Stones	Netflix
3	Euphoria	HBO
3	Genndy Tartakovsky's Primal	Adult Swim
2	The Cave	National Geographic
2	The Crown	Netflix
2	#FreeRayshawn	Quibi
2	Hollywood	Netflix
2	Live in Front of a Studio Audience: "All in the Family" and "Good Times"	ABC
2	The Oscars	ABC

=== Nominations and wins by network ===
Networks with multiple major nominations
Nominations	Network
37	Netflix
33	HBO
14	Hulu
12	NBC
11	FX/FX on Hulu
8	Pop TV
8	Prime Video
5	Apple TV+
4	ABC
4	AMC
4	BBC America
2	Showtime

Networks with five or more total nominations
Nominations	Network
160	Netflix
107	HBO
47	NBC
36	ABC
33	FX/FX on Hulu
31	Prime Video
26	Hulu
23	CBS
19	Disney+
18	Apple TV+
16	Pop TV
15	Fox
13	VH1
10	BBC America
10	Comedy Central
10	Quibi
8	AMC
8	National Geographic
5	CNN
5	Discovery Channel
5	PBS

Networks with multiple major wins
Wins	Network
11	HBO
7	Pop TV
2	Netflix

Networks with multiple total wins
Wins	Network
30	HBO
21	Netflix
10	Pop TV
8	Disney+
8	NBC
6	VH1
5	ABC
5	National Geographic
4	Adult Swim
4	Prime Video
3	CNN
3	Fox
2	CBS
2	FX/FX on Hulu
2	Quibi

== Presenters ==
The awards were presented by the following people:

Presenters at the ceremony
Name(s)	Role
Jennifer Aniston	Presented the award for Outstanding Lead Actress in a Comedy Series
Jimmy Kimmel	Presented the award for Outstanding Lead Actor in a Comedy Series
Tracee Ellis Ross	Presented the award for Outstanding Writing for a Comedy Series
Anthony Carrigan	Presented the award for Outstanding Directing for a Comedy Series
Cindy Marcelin	Presented the award for Outstanding Supporting Actor in a Comedy Series
Tim Loyd	Presented the award for Outstanding Supporting Actress in a Comedy Series
Zooey Deschanel; Morgan Freeman; Ilana Glazer; Abbi Jacobson; Elton John; Lin-Manuel Miranda; Shaquille O'Neal; Jason Sudeikis; Gabrielle Union; J. J. Watt; Count von Count	Presented the award for Outstanding Comedy Series
David Letterman	Presented the award for Outstanding Variety Talk Series
Jimmy Kimmel	Presented the award for Outstanding Lead Actress in a Limited Series or Movie
D-Nice	Presented the award for Outstanding Lead Actor in a Limited Series or Movie
Randall Park	Presented the award for Outstanding Writing for a Limited Series, Movie or Dramatic Special
Jimmy Kimmel	Presented the award for Outstanding Directing for a Limited Series, Movie or Dramatic Special
Caroline Nelson	Presented the award for Outstanding Supporting Actor in a Limited Series or Movie
Jacinda Duran	Presented the award for Outstanding Supporting Actress in a Limited Series or Movie
Anthony Anderson	Presented the award for Outstanding Limited Series
Jimmy Kimmel	Presented the award for Outstanding Competition Program
Chris Rock; Oprah Winfrey	Presented the Governors Award to Tyler Perry
Jimmy Kimmel	Presented the awards for Outstanding Lead Actor in a Drama Series and Outstanding Lead Actress in a Drama Series
Laverne Cox	Presented the award for Outstanding Writing for a Drama Series
Jimmy Kimmel	Presented the award for Outstanding Directing for a Drama Series
Karen and Kevin Tsai	Presented the award for Outstanding Supporting Actor in a Drama Series
Katie Duke	Presented the award for Outstanding Supporting Actress in a Drama Series
Sterling K. Brown	Presented the award for Outstanding Drama Series

== Ceremony information ==
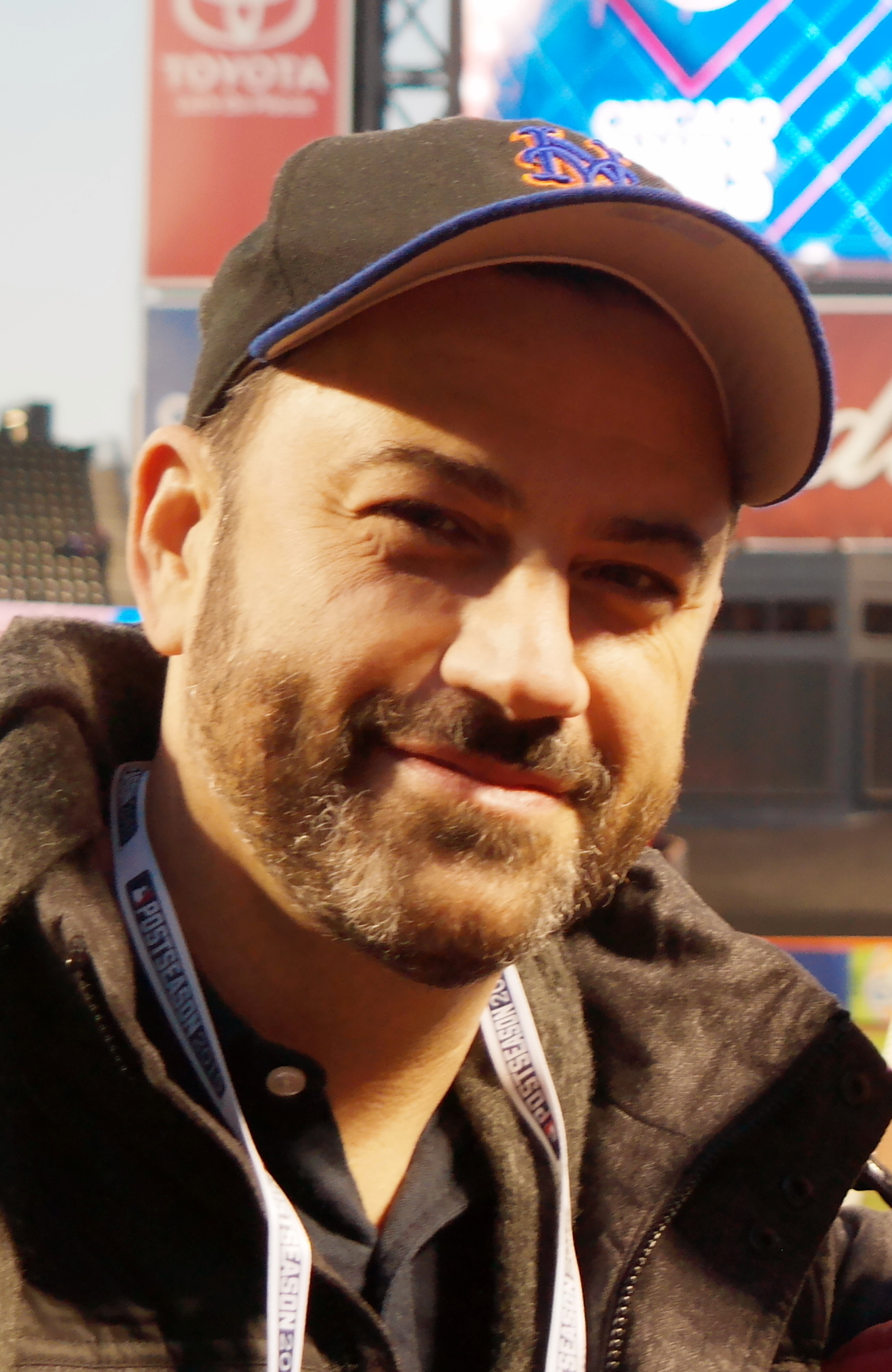
Jimmy Kimmel served as the ceremony's host.

As part of a rotating deal among the "Big Four" networks signed in 2018, ABC held the rights to broadcast the 72nd Primetime Emmy Awards. On January 8, 2020, during the Television Critics Association's annual winter tour, ABC announced that the ceremony would be broadcast on September 20 from the Microsoft Theater in Los Angeles, while the Creative Arts ceremonies would be held on September 12 and 13. However, the COVID-19 pandemic led to significant changes. The Academy of Television Arts & Sciences, also known as the Television Academy, announced on June 15 that the Creative Arts ceremonies would be presented virtually due to the pandemic. Additionally, the annual Governors Ball was cancelled for the first time in its history, with the Television Academy making a $1 million donation to the Actors Fund's COVID-19 efforts in its place. The new Creative Arts dates were announced in August, with the ceremonies to be aired across five nights between September 14 and 19. On July 29, the main ceremony was moved to a remote format as well.

Jimmy Kimmel was announced as the ceremony's host on June 16. This year marked his third time as host, following 2012 and 2016. Kimmel also served as an executive producer for the event. In July, Guy Carrington, Reginald Hudlin, David Jammy, and Ian Stewart were added as executive producers, with Done and Dusted producing the ceremony. Hamish Hamilton served as director for the event.

While Kimmel presented the ceremony from the Staples Center, no in-person festivities (such as a red carpet or audience) at the venue took place. Celebrity guests still made on-stage appearances, including Jennifer Aniston and Anthony Anderson. The broadcast used live feeds from each nominee, with television series being represented by one of their producers. A notable exception was Schitt's Creek, whose cast and crew appeared together from a viewing party in Toronto. To maintain a high-quality presentation, the use of video-conferencing was avoided, with producers sending "professional" cameras to each nominee's location, as well as an operator, if they so chose. Hudlin stated that they wanted to maintain a live broadcast, while Stewart argued that "we're not trying to make the Zoomies, we're trying to make the Emmys". Staples Center was chosen as the venue to ensure that appropriate social distancing could be maintained among crew members, and because it could support the infrastructure needed for the large number of remote feeds that would be used (estimated to be around 140).

A number of comedy gags acknowledged the pandemic and the format of the ceremony. Kimmel's opening monologue featured a laugh track and stock footage of audience reactions from past Emmy ceremonies. After culminating with a clip that paradoxically showed Kimmel himself as an audience member, he revealed the empty arena, and seats with cardboard cut-outs of nominees (except for the real Jason Bateman; Kimmel told him that he could stay if he promised to laugh at his jokes, but he declined and left). Kimmel was also seen disinfecting the envelope for Outstanding Lead Actress in a Comedy Series with Lysol spray; after Aniston commented that it was "a little extreme", Kimmel proceeded to throw it in a trash can and set it on fire instead. Some awards were delivered to winners via presenters in themed Hazmat suits designed to look like formalwear.

=== Category and rule changes ===
Several rule changes were announced in December 2019. First, episodes that were scheduled to air after the eligibility period closed, known as hanging episodes, were eligible for awards if they were made available on a member-accessible platform, such as the Television Academy's streaming platform, before May 31, 2020. Otherwise, those episodes would be eligible at the following year's ceremony. For limited series, all episodes had to be made available before May 31, or the series as a whole would have to compete the following year. Other changes included the elimination of DVD screeners to save money and waste, as well as a limit on actors playing the same character across multiple series – only one performance for that character could be submitted in a given year. Programs broadcast during prime time hours as an extension of daytime series were no longer eligible, and self-published programming had to be vetted to determine if it was "suitably competitive".

In March 2020, the deadline for hanging episodes was extended to June 30 due to production delays stemming from the COVID-19 pandemic; the nomination and voting periods were similarly delayed. All shows were still required to premiere before May 31 to be eligible for the 2020 ceremony. "For Your Consideration" events were initially moved from live settings to virtual events due to the pandemic, but were later suspended entirely.

On June 17, 2020, it was announced that the number of nominees in the Outstanding Comedy and Drama Series categories had been increased from seven to eight, regardless of the number of submissions. The number of nominees had last been increased in 2015, from six to seven. The Television Academy cited a 15% increase in submissions as the reason for the change. In other categories, a sliding scale based on the number of submissions would be used to determine the number of nominees; paired performance categories, such as supporting actor and actress in a comedy, would have the same number of nominees. The changes led to the elimination of the "2% rule", where submissions within two percent of the fifth-place nominee would also receive a nomination.

On August 6, alongside the announcement of the Creative Arts ceremony dates, four categories were moved from the main ceremony to Creative Arts ceremonies: Directing for a Variety Series, Writing for a Variety Series, Variety Sketch Series, and Television Movie. This left 23 categories to be presented at the main ceremony. Additionally, the Governors Award was moved from its usual presentation at a Creative Arts ceremony to the main ceremony. The move drew criticism from the Writers Guild of America and Directors Guild of America, which were contractually guaranteed four writing and four directing categories during the broadcast.

=== Critical reviews and viewership ===
The broadcast received generally positive reviews from critics. Time's Judy Berman called the ceremony "one of the most enjoyable awards shows in recent memory" thanks not to one major decision but instead due to the many details that succeeded. She felt Kimmel's turn as host provided some energy and consistency, even as his performance was simply okay. Linda Holmes of NPR also noted that the broadcast "wasn't just watchable; it was ... pretty good", with the remote setup providing a level of intimacy and unpredictability missing from other awards shows. IndieWire's Ben Travers called it "a memorable, entertaining, and technically immaculate awards show", praising the technical team and the decision to favor live speeches over recorded segments.

Mike Hale of The New York Times was more critical of the ceremony, remarking that the Emmys "continued [their] trend of feeling out of tune with the way most of us watch TV". He added that the remote appearances and pretaped portions evoked nostalgia for "the hothouse atmosphere and occasional breakdowns" of live ceremonies, with spontaneity replaced by "stage-managed banality". Hank Stuever, writing for The Washington Post, found that the ceremony "more than met the challenge that the pandemic handed it" but failed to inspire any permanent ideas for changes to the awards show format. Robert Lloyd remarked in the Los Angeles Times that the show "felt solid enough to accommodate the occasional technical difficulty", adding that because almost everything was unprecedented, it was "minute for minute more interesting than these long nights of self-celebration usually are". He found that Kimmel was the right host for the event, providing "a walking dose of normality" to the proceedings.

The ceremony was watched by 6.36 million viewers in the United States, falling below the previous year's ceremony to become the least-watched Emmys telecast in history. It achieved a 1.3 rating among adults ages 18–49, also a record low. The ceremony faced competition from both an NFL broadcast and, for the first time, a playoff game for the NBA. Additionally, the ceremony lacked a red carpet show leading into the ceremony, which may have affected viewership.

=== Criticism regarding lack of diversity ===
Following the nomination announcement, the Television Academy was criticized for its lack of transgender nominees. Several cast members and affiliates of the FX drama Pose, which is set in New York City's LGBT ballroom scene, criticized the Television Academy for excluding its many transgender stars from the acting categories. There was similar criticism from affiliates of the HBO series Euphoria, for which transgender actress Hunter Schafer did not receive a nomination despite critical acclaim. However, despite these snubs, Rain Valdez became the second transgender person to be nominated for a Primetime Emmy for acting, receiving a nomination for Outstanding Actress in a Short Form Comedy or Drama Series.

Further criticism resulted from the lack of Latino nominees. While there was a record number of black nominees, there was limited recognition for shows starring Latino casts and only one Latino or Latina nomination in any acting category (Alexis Bledel for Outstanding Guest Actress in a Drama Series). The Congressional Hispanic Caucus called the lack of nominations a "demoralizing disappointment for the U.S.'s largest minority group". When the Los Angeles Times reported the criticism using the terms "Black" and "Latino" separately, it was itself criticized for failing to recognize Afro-Latinos. John Leguizamo boycotted the Emmys because of its lack of Latino nominees, remarking, "If you don't have Latin people, there's no reason for me to see it." Before the nominations were announced, Porter suggested that his Pose co-star Mj Rodriguez, who is transgender and Afro-Latina, was not receiving recognition because the Television Academy's members "don't know how to adjudicate the performance" and so simply exclude it.

The Emmys also faced criticism from the Asian American community, leveled because Asian Americans only made up one percent of the nominees. The relative lack of nominations was attributed to both the small number of shows featuring Asian Americans and the perception among some voters that such shows are niche or foreign. Mindy Kaling, creator of Never Have I Ever, criticized the Emmys for not nominating the series for any Emmy categories despite its success, suggesting that it was overlooked because "Sometimes a show like ours will always seem ethnic or niche to a certain group of people."

== In Memoriam ==
The annual In Memoriam segment featured H.E.R. performing "Nothing Compares 2 U" on piano and electric guitar.

- Regis Philbin – host
- Naya Rivera – actor
- Adam Schlesinger – songwriter
- Caroll Spinney – actor
- Herb Granath – executive
- Dorothy "D.C." Fontana – writer
- James Lipton – host
- Jim Lehrer – broadcaster
- Shirley Knight – actor
- Robert Conrad – actor
- Silvio Horta – writer
- Robert Forster – actor
- Thomas L. Miller – producer
- Lee Mendelson – producer
- Rick Ludwin – executive
- Fred Willard – actor
- Jas Waters – writer
- Brian Dennehy – actor
- Leonard Goldberg – producer
- David Bellisario – producer
- René Auberjonois – actor
- Rip Taylor – actor
- Mary Rose – costume designer
- Ken Osmond – actor
- Hugh Downs – broadcaster
- Lynn Shelton – director
- Wilford Brimley – actor
- Jerry Stiller – actor
- Ian Holm – actor
- Kellye Nakahara – actor
- Gene Reynolds – director
- Buck Henry – writer
- Lyle Waggoner – actor
- Bill Macy – actor
- John Witherspoon – actor
- Phyllis George – sportscaster
- Nanci Ryder – publicist
- Diana Rigg – actor
- Gil Schwartz – executive
- Diahann Carroll – actor
- Sumner Redstone – executive
- Max von Sydow – actor
- Fred Silverman – executive
- Carl Reiner – actor
- Ja'Net DuBois – actor
- Kirk Douglas – actor
- Chadwick Boseman – actor

Before the In Memoriam montage, Kimmel paid tribute to United States Supreme Court Justice Ruth Bader Ginsburg, who died two days before the ceremony. A speech recorded by Boseman was played at the end of the montage.
