= Bad Choice Road =

- Better Call Saul episode
- Promotional poster
- Episode no.: Season 5 Episode 9
- Directed by: Thomas Schnauz
- Written by: Thomas Schnauz
- Original air date: April 13, 2020
- Running time: 59 minutes

Guest appearances
- Dennis Boutsikaris as Rich Schweikart; Ray Campbell as Tyrus Kitt; Javier Grajeda as Juan Bolsa; Saidah Arrika Ekulona as ADA Gina Khalil; Jeremiah Bitsui as Victor; Peter Diseth as Bill Oakley; Katerina Tannenbaum as Amber; Poppy Liu as Jo; Mark Margolis as Hector Salamanca

Episode chronology
← Previous "Bagman"	Next → "Something Unforgivable"
- Better Call Saul season 5

"Bad Choice Road" is the ninth and penultimate episode of the fifth season of the AMC crime drama television series Better Call Saul, a spin-off series of Breaking Bad. The episode aired on April 13, 2020, on AMC in the United States. Outside of the United States, the episode premiered on streaming service Netflix in several countries.

== Plot ==
Jimmy McGill and Mike Ehrmantraut arrive at a truck stop where Tyrus Kitt and Victor pick them up. Jimmy posts Lalo Salamanca's bail and Lalo is released. As Mike and Jimmy agreed, Jimmy tells Lalo his car broke down and he walked alone cross-country so he would not risk losing the money. Lalo tells Jimmy he plans to avoid prosecution by returning to Mexico.

Kim tends to Jimmy's sunburn and bruises and he tells her the same story he told Lalo. Kim realizes he is lying when she sees Jimmy's bullet-pierced coffee tumbler. (Note: The "World's 2nd Best Lawyer" travel mug Kim gave Jimmy during "Cobbler".)

Mike reports to Gus Fring, who realizes Juan Bolsa arranged the attack on Jimmy to protect Gus' business. Mike tells Gus that Nacho Varga wants to stop working as Gus' informant, but Gus refuses to release a valuable asset.

Jimmy ends a day of convalescence early to deal with a client. Kim tells him she knows he is lying and will be ready to listen when he decides to tell the truth. Kim quits Schweikart and Cokely, handing over the Mesa Verde account and keeping her pro bono clients. As she departs, she takes the tequila bottle stopper she previously kept as a souvenir. (Note: As seen during the events of "Switch".)

Jimmy tells Mike he is experiencing post-traumatic stress. Mike tells Jimmy it will pass with time. (Note: Echoing what Stacey Ehrmantraut said during a group therapy session in "Talk".) When Jimmy questions the events that brought them to the desert, Mike says they both made choices, good and bad, and must live with the consequences.

Lalo says goodbye to Hector Salamanca and has Nacho bring him to the desert pickup site. Instead of waiting for the Cousins, he decides to search for Jimmy's car. After finding it, he tells Nacho to drive back to Albuquerque.

At home, Jimmy and Kim argue about Kim quitting S&C. Mike calls Jimmy to warn him of Lalo's imminent arrival and tells Jimmy to keep his cell phone on but hidden. As Mike listens in and trains a sniper rifle on Lalo from a nearby roof, Lalo has Jimmy repeat the story of his desert walk, then reveals he found Jimmy's car, which was riddled with bullet holes. Kim tells Lalo that passersby probably shot at the car for fun and berates him for not trusting Jimmy. Lalo seems satisfied and departs. He tells Nacho to drive to Mexico, but not the original pickup site.

== Production ==
Paying homage to the season four episode "Something Stupid", the episode begins with a split screen montage involving Jimmy and Kim, set to an instrumental version of Lola Marsh's "Somethin' Stupid" playing in the background. The final scene, with Lalo arriving at Kim and Jimmy's apartment, ran for sixteen minutes without commercial breaks in the original broadcast in order to keep the dramatic tension. Other scenes in the episode were made shorter to allow for additional ad space, which enabled the ad-free final scene.

Alan Sepinwall of Rolling Stone observed that the film that Kim and Jimmy try to watch before Jimmy is called into court is His Girl Friday, which Sepinwall describes as "about a woman who keeps returning to a relationship she knows is deeply unhealthy for her, with a man whose charm and wild professional lifestyle she ultimately can’t resist."

== Reception ==
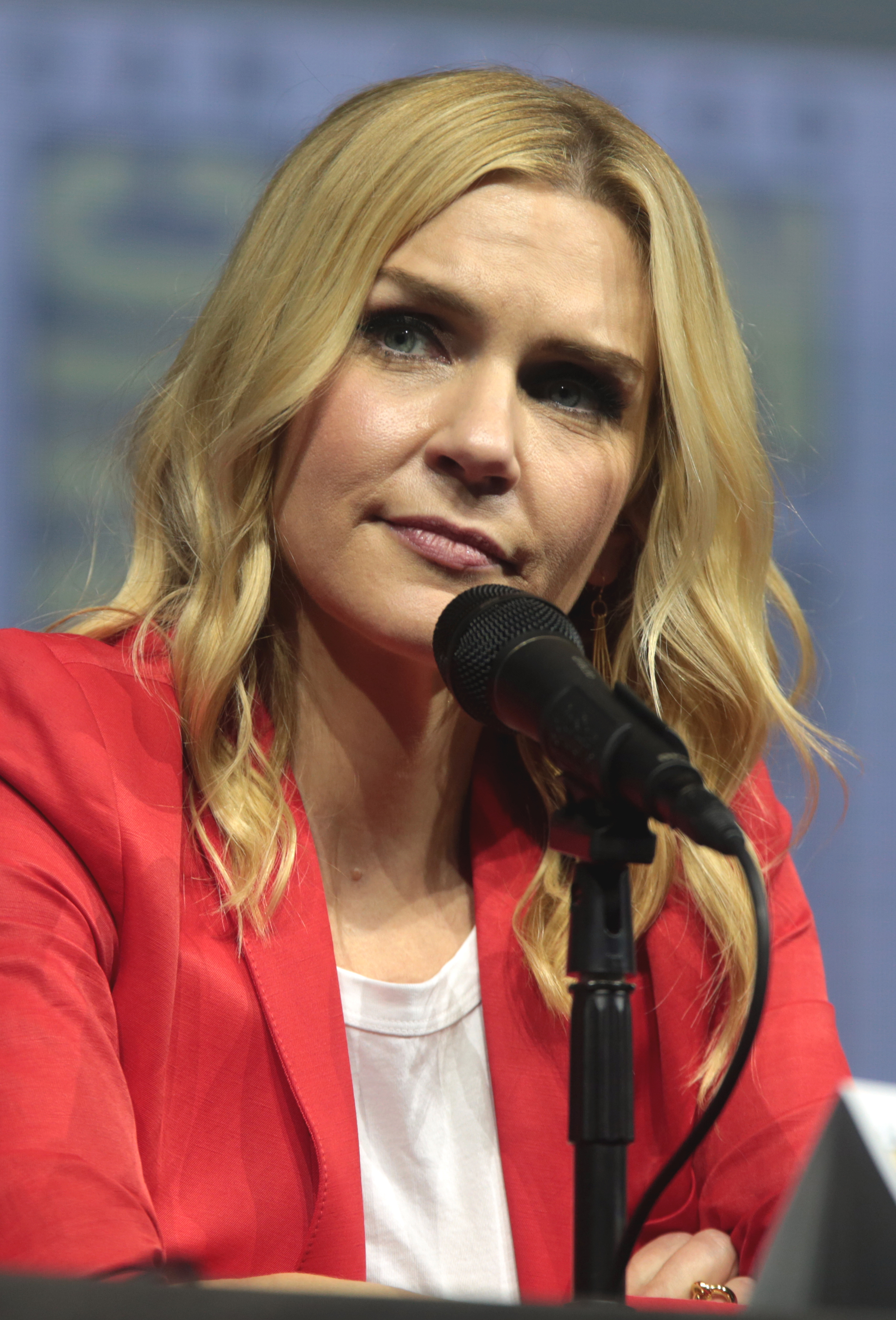
Rhea Seehorn was acclaimed for her performance in the final scene.

"Bad Choice Road" was praised by critics, with many calling it one of the best episodes of the series. It has a 100% rating from Rotten Tomatoes, with an average 9.17 out of 10 rating from 13 reviews.

The final scene, the confrontation between Lalo, Jimmy, and Kim, was highly regarded by critics as one of the best scenes of the series, attributing its framing to the scriptwriter and director Thomas Schnauz, and to performances by the lead actors particularly for Rhea Seehorn as Kim and Tony Dalton as Lalo. Sepinwall of Rolling Stone called the scene a "knockout performance" for Seehorn, and the scene itself critical to the show as "the two halves of Better Call Saul itself, long held separate, finally merge into one thrilling, terrifying story". David Segal of The New York Times called the final scene "a nonviolent, psychologically fraught ending to an episode that is low on action and very interior". Steve Greene of IndieWire described the scene as an "impeccably braided sequence, with three threads woven together at a point when a blade threatens to slice each one of them to bits. For a sequence with so little movement, there's a certain choreography at work here that goes beyond simple blocking. Every inch matters when there's a sniper sight trained on the man with a gun in the living room."

TVLine named Rhea Seehorn a "Performer of the Week" for her performance in this episode.

=== Ratings ===
"Bad Choice Road" was watched by approximately 1.51 million viewers on its first broadcast.

=== Accolades ===
For the 72nd Primetime Emmy Awards, Thomas Schnauz received a nomination for Outstanding Writing for a Drama Series for this episode.
