= Winner (Better Call Saul) =

- Better Call Saul episode
- Episode no.: Season 4 Episode 10
- Directed by: Adam Bernstein
- Written by: Peter Gould; Thomas Schnauz
- Original air date: October 8, 2018
- Running time: 60 minutes

Guest appearances
- Michael McKean as Chuck McGill; David Costabile as Gale Boetticher; Rainer Bock as Werner Ziegler; Tony Dalton as Lalo Salamanca; Dennis Boutsikaris as Rich Schweikart; Josh Fadem as Joey; Abby Quinn as Christy Esposito; Hayley Holmes as The Make-Up Girl; Jeremiah Bitsui as Victor; Ray Campbell as Tyrus Kitt; John Christian Love as Ernesto; Colleen Flynn as Committee Member; James Austin Johnson as Fred Whalen; Nick Bush as The Milk Shake Guy

Episode chronology
← Previous "Wiedersehen"	Next → "Magic Man"
- Better Call Saul season 4

"Winner" is the tenth and final episode of the fourth season of the AMC television series Better Call Saul, a spinoff Breaking Bad. The episode aired on October 8, 2018, on AMC in the United States. Outside of the United States, the episode premiered on Netflix.

In the episode, Jimmy McGill (Bob Odenkirk) attempts to convince an appeals panel of the New Mexico Bar Association that he should be reinstated as a lawyer, after the original panel rejected him for being "insincere". After Werner Ziegler (Rainer Bock) escapes from the secret, high-security construction project he is working on for Gus Fring (Giancarlo Esposito), Gus' fixer Mike (Jonathan Banks) attempts to find him and bring him back. At the same time, Lalo Salamanca (Tony Dalton) is pursuing Werner so that he can figure out what Gus is up to.

== Plot ==
=== Opening ===
In 1998, HHM's staff visits a karaoke club to celebrate Jimmy McGill attaining admission to the New Mexico bar. (Note: As seen in "RICO".) Chuck is bored and tries to leave, but Jimmy cheers him up by having him sing "The Winner Takes It All" by ABBA together. They drunkenly return to Jimmy's apartment where they fall asleep in his bed, where they once again sing "The Winner Takes It All".

=== Main story ===
In 2004, Mike Ehrmantraut tracks Werner Ziegler to a money wire agency and convinces the clerk, Fred Whalen, to let him view security camera footage. Based on Werner's actions in the agency's lobby, Mike guesses Werner is going to meet his wife at a hot spring resort and begins calling hotels. He notices Lalo Salamanca's car following him and evades it.

Kim Wexler and Jimmy stage several events where Jimmy feigns remorse over Chuck's death to influence the appeals panel considering Jimmy's reinstatement. (Note: As seen in "Wiedersehen".)

Lalo goes to the money wire agency, kills Fred, reviews the security footage, then calls hotels until he locates Werner. Pretending to work for Gus Fring, he extracts some details of Werner's work before Mike arrives at the hotel to end the call.

Jimmy sits on a panel at HHM reviewing candidates for scholarships in Chuck's name. Jimmy tries unsuccessfully to persuade Howard Hamlin and the other members to award a scholarship to Christy, whose background includes a shoplifting charge. Afterward, he encourages her not to stick to the upright path she is attempting to follow, but to do whatever is necessary to succeed because "the winner takes it all".

Gus decides Werner must die and offers to send men, but Mike accepts responsibility. He has Werner call his wife and convince her to return home, promises to make Werner's death look accidental, and guarantees the safety of Werner's crew. He shoots Werner, then calls Gus with a report. Gus receives the call as he and Gale Boetticher inspect the unfinished meth lab, which is being created according to Gale's design. (Note: Gale's design is contained in the same notebook seen in the Breaking Bad episode "Bullet Points".)

At his appeal, Jimmy gives an impromptu speech promising to be "worthy of the name McGill", and wins reinstatement. He then stuns Kim by revealing his performance was insincere and states his intention not to practice under the name McGill. Kim asks why and as Jimmy leaves with a clerk to procure a doing business as form, he exclaims "S'all good man!".

== Production ==
"Winner" was written by Peter Gould and Thomas Schnauz. It was directed by Adam Bernstein, who also directed the episodes "Five-O", "Gloves Off", and "Slip".

This episode includes guest appearances from Michael McKean as Chuck McGill and Brandon K. Hampton as Ernesto, both of whom appear in the flashback. The directors had written the cold open with the desire to utilize McKean's background as a singer. In Episode 1 of Season 1 ("Uno"), Jimmy displays post-meeting frustration with Howard by kicking a trash can located inside the doorway between the HHM office building and parking garage. In "Winner", Jimmy passes the dented trash can, which is still visible inside the doorway.

== Reception ==
"Winner" received critical acclaim. On Rotten Tomatoes, it garnered a perfect 100% rating with an average score of 9.1/10 based on 19 reviews. The site's critical consensus is, "An excellent ending to a bittersweet season, 'Winner' ties up loose threads while priming each of Better Call Saul's excellently drawn characters for the coming danger."

=== Accolades ===
The episode received four nominations at the 71st Primetime Emmy Awards: Outstanding Lead Actor in a Drama Series for Bob Odenkirk, Outstanding Supporting Actor in a Drama Series for Jonathan Banks, Primetime Emmy Award for Outstanding Writing for a Drama Series for Peter Gould and Thomas Schnauz, and Outstanding Guest Actor in a Drama Series for Michael McKean.

=== Ratings ===
"Winner" was watched by 1.53 million viewers on its first broadcast, earning a 0.5 rating for viewers between 18 and 49.
