= Lalo Salamanca =

Character from the TV series "Better Call Saul"

- Better Call Saul character
- Tony Dalton as Lalo in a promotional poster for Better Call Saul's fifth season
- First appearance: "Coushatta"; September 24, 2018
- Last appearance: "Point and Shoot"; July 11, 2022
- Created by: Peter Gould; Gordon Smith
- Portrayed by: Tony Dalton

In-universe information
- Full name: Eduardo Salamanca
- Aliases: Jorge de Guzmán; Ben
- Occupation: Cartel operator
- Relatives: "Abuelita" (grandmother); Hector Salamanca (uncle); Tuco Salamanca (cousin); Leonel Salamanca (cousin); Marco Salamanca (cousin); Joaquin Salamanca (first cousin once removed)
- Home: Chihuahua, Mexico
- Nationality: Mexican

Eduardo "Lalo", "Tell me Again", Salamanca (/ˈlɑːloʊ ˌsæləˈmɑːŋkə/ LAH-loh SAL-ə-MAHNK-ə, Spanish: [eˈðwaɾðo ˈlalo salaˈmaŋka]) is a fictional character and one of the main antagonists of the AMC television series Better Call Saul, a spin-off of Breaking Bad. He is portrayed by Tony Dalton, with the character being created by Peter Gould and screenwriter Gordon Smith. Originally mentioned in dialogue from the Breaking Bad episode "Better Call Saul", Lalo was not introduced until the fourth season of Better Call Saul.

Lalo is one of many nephews of Hector Salamanca, an enforcer of Don Eladio Vuente's drug cartel. After Hector becomes paralyzed due to a stroke, Lalo arrives from Mexico to help run the family drug operation in Albuquerque, New Mexico; he takes a greater interest in the day-to-day details of the operation than Hector did. Because of the rivalry between Hector and Gus Fring, Lalo becomes determined to disrupt both Gus' legitimate business and his reputation with the cartel.

Showrunners gave Dalton freedom to diverge from cartel stereotypes and portrayals of the other members of the Salamanca family. Series co-creator Vince Gilligan held himself responsible for delaying Lalo's introduction, which occurred because Gould wanted to introduce Lalo as early as season one. Unlike most other Salamancas, Lalo appears charismatic and cheerful; however, he can also be merciless and chaotic. Dalton's portrayal has been critically acclaimed, with some critics deeming Lalo to be one of the best villains on television.

== Conception and development ==
In July 2018, Tony Dalton joined Better Call Saul in the role of Lalo Salamanca, first appearing in the season four episode "Coushatta". The Breaking Bad second-season episode "Better Call Saul" mentions Lalo and also introduces Saul Goodman—Jimmy McGill's business name—and mentions "Ignacio" (Nacho Varga). In an interview before Better Call Saul aired, Vince Gilligan said the writers had envisioned Lalo as a major character and as with Breaking Bad, they must "keep close tabs on what our characters have done in the past and make good use of it here in the present and the future". Gilligan and Peter Gould, however, had difficulty deciding how to properly introduce the character, whom they considered a bogeyman around the second season of Breaking Bad but had not worked out his personality or motivations. Gilligan held himself responsible for delaying Lalo's introduction, as Gould had wanted to introduce Lalo as early as season one. Gould realized Lalo needed to be different from the other members of the Salamanca family and a foil equal to Gus Fring. He credited the show's casting directors Sherry Thomas and Sharon Bialy for selecting Dalton for the role, adding Dalton had "the charm, and the joy, and the threat" needed for the character and "all the charm of a '40s movie star". Gould said Lalo's name is an homage to the Argentine American composer Lalo Schifrin.

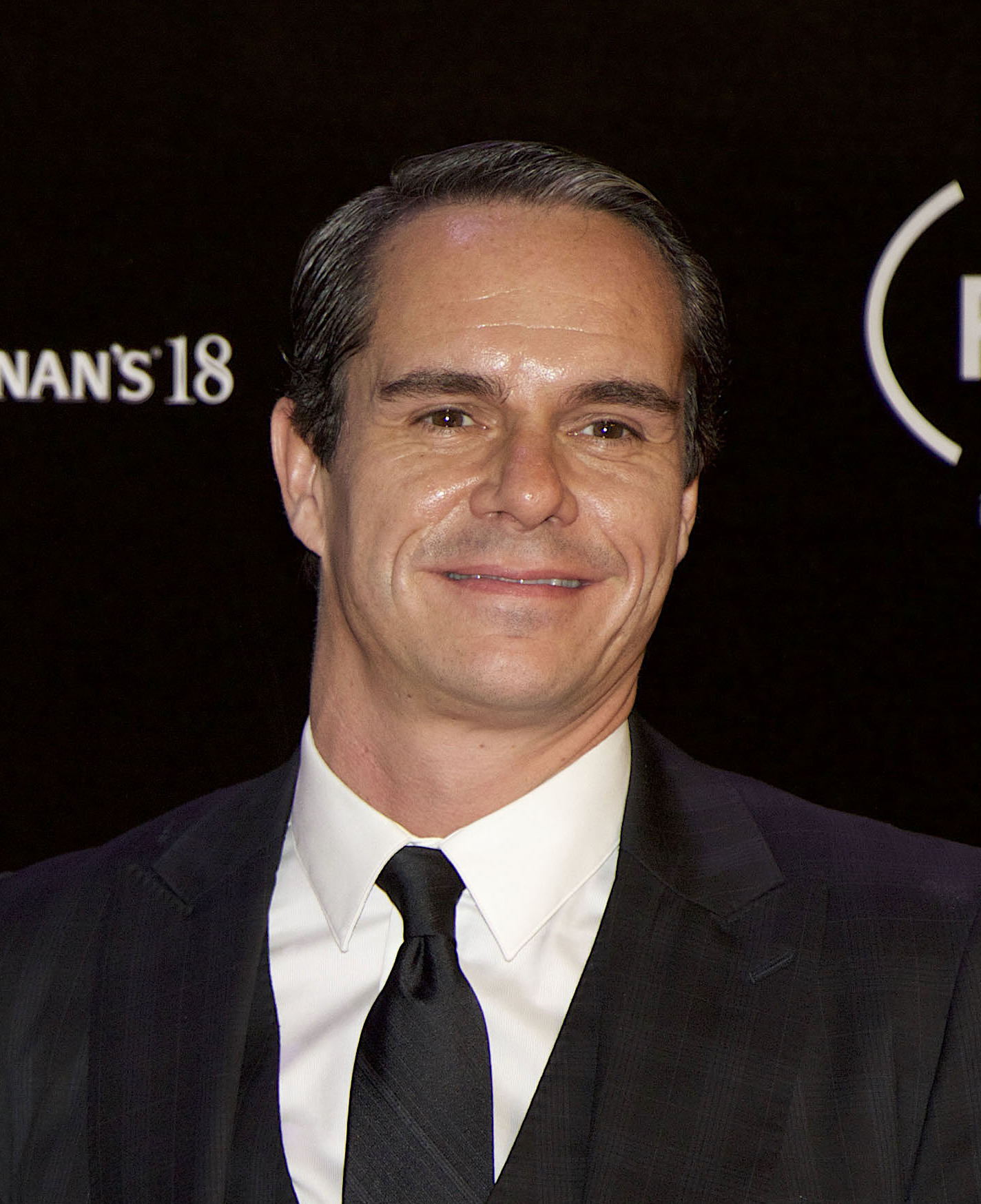
Tony Dalton portrays Lalo Salamanca

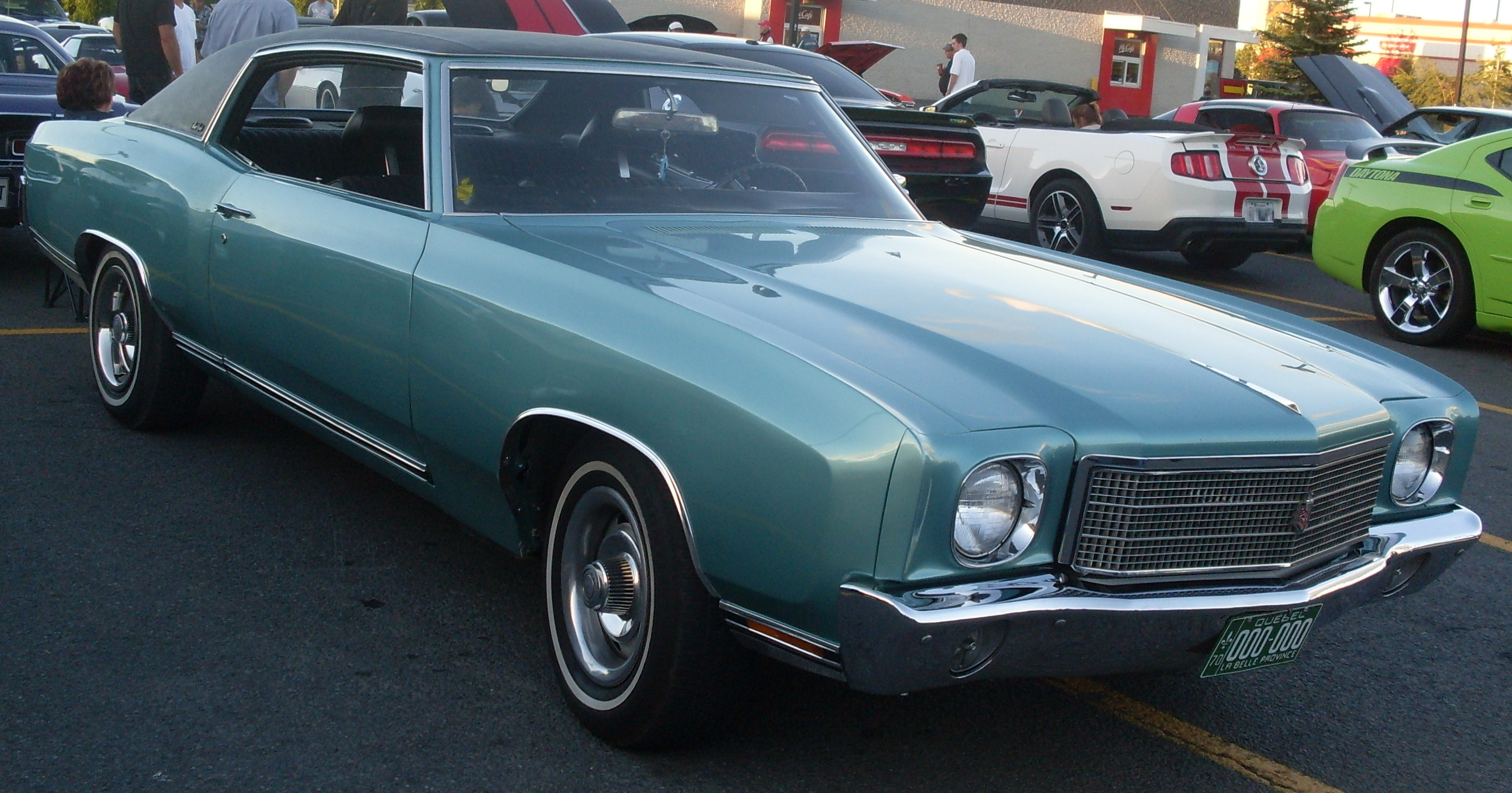
A 1970 Chevrolet Monte Carlo, Lalo's signature vehicle

The episode "Wiedersehen", which was written by Gennifer Hutchison, further develops Lalo. Hutchison said while Lalo is just as "scary" as the other Salamancas, he is "a little more circumspect about things". She said the producers wanted him to be "a little charming", in contrast to the other Salamancas, whom she felt have few qualities beyond fearsomeness. Dalton said the season-five finale "Something Unforgivable" provides a breadth not seen in prior episodes. Lalo first appears as a charismatic person his extended family and cartel leaders welcome but shows a vicious, vengeful side after his family is attacked. Dalton said this personality in season six differentiates him from the laid-back personality he displays in season five. Michael Mando, who portrays Nacho, described Lalo as "a Salamanca in every way, just like Tuco and Hector had their own flavors to the erratic Salamancas". Gilligan and Gould gave Dalton freedom to portray Lalo's personality as he saw fit, just as they had allowed Jonathan Banks to develop Mike Ehrmantraut during Breaking Bad, though they told Dalton to think of Lalo as somewhat a "Prince of the Narcos". Dalton considers Lalo to be in juxtaposition to Gus due to Lalo's laid-back attitude and "loose body language" that contrasts with Gus being constantly anxious and having a tighter body language.

According to Dalton, Lalo was not originally intended to be charming; he felt the series needed someone "kind of smiling and carefree and a little bit mischievous" like Jimmy but "in the bad guy's part". Dalton took inspiration from Samuel L. Jackson's character Jules Winnfield in Pulp Fiction (1994) to create a "[k]ind of this smart ass, sort of scary but kind of carefree, kind of cool guy". The negative characters portrayed by Jack Nicholson also influenced Dalton's portrayal of Lalo. Dalton sought to distance himself from his role in the television series Sr. Ávila, in which he played a hitman who he felt had "zero personality". Dalton instead took inspiration from Geoffrey Rush's character in Elizabeth (1998) who smiles while killing. Dalton toned down Lalo's Mexican accent because of his belief the character, given his wealth, was educated in a "good school" in the United States. He chose for the character an accent he had developed while growing up around Laredo, Texas. Dalton gave Lalo an upbeat personality to show the character's normally easy-going outlook on life and to distance him from typical portrayals of cartel members as serious about their work. Lalo is killed by Gus in the season-six episode "Point and Shoot". Gordon Smith said the writers considered having Mike kill Lalo but this idea was discarded to let the "biggest big bads" in the series—Gus and Lalo—confront each other.

== Character biography ==
=== Better Call Saul ===
==== Season 4 ====
Eduardo "Lalo" Salamanca is one of many nephews of Hector Salamanca, an enforcer of Don Eladio Vuente's drug cartel. After Hector suffers a stroke that leaves him paralyzed and unable to speak, Lalo moves from Mexico to Albuquerque to oversee the Salamanca family's drug operation, and takes a greater interest in day-to-day details than Hector did. Ignacio "Nacho" Varga, Hector's subordinate, is secretly responsible for Hector's stroke and acts as a mole for Hector's rival Gus Fring, so Lalo's arrival leaves him uneasy. Lalo visits Hector in the nursing home and gives him a front desk call bell he saved when Hector killed a hotelier and burned down the hotel after the hotelier disrespected him. Lalo attaches the bell to Hector's wheelchair so Hector can communicate by ringing it with his right index finger, the only body part he can move. Lalo then arrives at Los Pollos Hermanos and introduces himself to Gus. Lalo thanks Gus for giving Hector first aid and paying for his care, but surveils Gus' underlings to learn about their regular activities.

While staking out Gus' chicken farm, Lalo observes activity related to Werner Ziegler's escape. He follows Mike Ehrmantraut as Mike tracks Werner, leading him to a Travelwire store. Mike guesses Werner is going to a hot springs resort and persuades Gus to let him retrieve Werner instead of sending hitmen. After Mike and Gus leave, Lalo enters and tries to learn what Mike knows but the clerk, Fred Whalen, refuses to tell him. Lalo kills Fred, reviews the security footage Mike saw, and sets fire to the store. Lalo calls resorts until he finds Werner; he then poses as Gus' employee and tricks Werner into revealing details about the construction of a methamphetamine lab under Gus' industrial laundry. Mike arrives at Werner's location and ends the call but realizes Lalo now has information about the construction. Mike reports to Gus, who realizes Werner will have to be killed to prevent Lalo from learning more; Mike accepts responsibility and kills Werner.

==== Season 5 ====
Gus draws Lalo to a meeting by "stepping on" the Salamancas' share of the cartel's cocaine. With Juan Bolsa present, Gus tells Lalo that Werner was working on a legitimate project and fled after stealing cocaine. He claims he then attempted to cover for the loss by replacing the stolen product with local, inferior meth, and shows a chiller as "proof" of Werner's project. Lalo outwardly accepts Gus' explanation and apology. Bolsa tells Lalo that Gus enjoys Eladio's trust so Lalo should consider the matter closed. Because of Lalo's presence in Albuquerque, Gus halts work on the meth lab. Lalo tells Hector he does not believe Gus' cover story about the chiller; Hector confirms the cartel tolerates Gus only because he earns well.

When Krazy-8 is arrested outside a Salamanca stash house, Nacho gains Lalo's trust by climbing over rooftops to sneak in and recover the drugs before police enter; Lalo is impressed and takes Nacho into his confidence. Nacho then introduces Lalo to Jimmy, now working under the alias of Saul Goodman, who knows of Jimmy from Tuco. Lalo asks Jimmy to represent Krazy-8 and free him by using him to feed the Drug Enforcement Administration (DEA) information on Gus' dead drops. Jimmy is unsure and provides an exorbitant fee for his services, which Lalo immediately and easily pays up. Nacho informs Gus about the plan, who accepts the loss of cash from the dead drops to protect Nacho's role as his informant. Jimmy secures Krazy-8's release and makes him a confidential informant for DEA agent Hank Schrader. Lalo congratulates Jimmy but Nacho warns him once he begins working for drug dealers, there is no turning back.

While posing as a private investigator for Fred's family, Mike persuades a witness to Fred's murder to provide police with details about Lalo's car, leading to Lalo's arrest. In jail under the alias "Jorge de Guzman", Lalo hires Jimmy to get him out on bail, promising him that if he does, he will become a "friend of the cartel". He is initially denied bail and is suspicious of how the police came to pursue him, but is able to use connections from inside to contact Nacho and instruct him to burn down one of Gus' restaurants. Gus realizes Lalo will continue to be a problem but decides killing him will create tension with the cartel, so Gus and Nacho again protect Nacho's role as Gus' informant by burning down the restaurant. Gus then orchestrates Lalo's release by having Mike provide Jimmy with details of Mike's investigation, which Jimmy uses to accuse police of witness tampering. The judge grants Lalo bail, which is set at $7 million cash.

Jimmy reluctantly agrees to be the "bagman" and pick up the money from Lalo's cousins, Leonel and Marco, at a remote desert location, for $100,000. On his return trip, gunmen stop Jimmy, take the cash, and prepare to kill him. However, Mike was following Jimmy for Gus and kills all but one gunman. They continue the return trip to Albuquerque with the money; when Jimmy's car breaks down, they push it off the side of the road, take the cash, and walk for two days. On the second day, they kill the remaining gunman then continue their journey to Albuquerque. Meanwhile, Jimmy's wife Kim Wexler, anxious by his disappearance, confronts Lalo about his whereabouts, but he refuses to say anything, confident he will return eventually.

Jimmy eventually makes it out of the desert, posts Lalo's bail, and hides Mike's involvement by claiming he was alone and walked after his car broke down. Mike reports to Gus, who realizes Bolsa sent the gunmen in the belief he was protecting Gus' business by keeping Lalo imprisoned. Lalo prepares to return to Mexico to avoid trial, but his suspicions lead him to search for and find Jimmy's abandoned car, filled with bullet holes. Lalo returns to Albuquerque and confronts Jimmy and Kim at her apartment, intimidating the former by making him repeat the story of what happened in the desert multiple times. He eventually reveals he found the car with bullet holes, however Kim steps in and claims that a passerby probably shot at it for fun, berating him for not trusting Jimmy, despite being the only one he could trust to retrieve money. Satisfied enough, Lalo leaves for Mexico, this time taking Nacho with him.

At Lalo's Chihuahua home, friends and family greet him and Nacho. Lalo introduces Nacho to Eladio, who blesses the plan for Nacho to oversee the Salamanca drug business in Lalo's absence. Gus sends assassins to Lalo's home and Nacho receives a call instructing him to leave Lalo's back gate open at 3am. Lalo is awake at the appointed hour so Nacho sets a kitchen fire to distract him and opens the gate. Nacho flees as the assassins enter and kill most of Lalo's family and guards. Lalo kills the assassins and forces the last one alive to report that the mission is a success. Lalo then realizes Nacho is missing and angrily strides away from his house.

==== Season 6 ====
Lalo kills a tenant, who he had been grooming to resemble him, and leaves the burned body inside his home, causing police and the cartel to assume Lalo is dead; Lalo had paid to have the tenant's teeth cosmetically altered to match his. On his way back across the border, Lalo calls Hector to inform him that he is alive and intends to kill Gus in revenge for the attack. Hector indicates that Lalo will need proof of Gus' treachery that is strong enough to persuade Eladio, and Lalo realizes the proof is not in the United States, so he abandons plans to sneak back into New Mexico. After Bolsa and Gus visit Hector and promise him vengeance for Lalo's supposed death, Gus realizes from Hector's demeanor that Lalo is still alive. Now anticipating a revenge attack by Lalo, Gus has Mike arrange for around-the-clock guards for his home and businesses; Mike also stations men to observe Jimmy and Kim. Arriving in Germany under an alias, Lalo befriends Werner's widow Margarethe, and after breaking into her home, discovers a lucite sculpture given to Werner by his crew. He uses the sculptor's label to locate Casper, whom he disables and coerces into revealing details of the project Werner was supervising.

Lalo returns to Albuquerque and stakes out the laundry, intending to get video footage of the meth lab for Eladio. Lalo prepares to call Hector, but hangs up after realizing Gus has probably tapped the line. He tricks Gus by calling Hector and pretending he plans to attack Gus at his home. Mike plays a recording of the call for Gus, then diverts men to Gus' home, leaving other potential targets unguarded. Lalo then instead arrives at Jimmy and Kim's apartment, where Howard Hamlin is confronting them about their plan to ruin his reputation. Kim implores Howard to leave but Lalo simply shoots Howard dead.

Lalo gives Jimmy an address and general description of Gus, and tells him to go there and shoot the person described. Jimmy persuades Lalo to send Kim instead. After Kim leaves, Lalo ties up Jimmy and tells him about Nacho's betrayal and the attack on his compound; Jimmy denies involvement and blames Nacho. Lalo leaves for the laundry after promising to interrogate Jimmy upon his return. Kim is apprehended at Gus' door and Gus realizes sending Kim to his house was a diversion, so he goes to the laundry. Lalo kills Gus' guards then forces Gus to show him the unfinished lab while he videotapes it. Lalo prepares to kill Gus, but Gus cuts power to the lights and shoots towards Lalo with a gun he had earlier hidden in the lab. Lalo, having been shot in the throat, dies by choking on his own blood, though also laughing. Mike buries Lalo and Howard's corpses beneath the floor of the lab, then tells Jimmy and Kim they will not see Lalo again. Gus is called to Eladio's home, where Bolsa reads Hector's statement claiming Lalo survived the shootout at his house, that Gus sent the gunmen, and has since killed Lalo for real. With no proof of Lalo's initial survival, Eladio dismisses Hector's accusations.

=== Breaking Bad ===
==== Season 2 ====
In 2008, when Walter White and Jesse Pinkman kidnap Saul to coerce him into representing Badger, who has been arrested for selling meth, a terrified Saul believes Lalo sent them and says, "It wasn't me! It was Ignacio!". Saul is relieved when Walter and Jesse's confusion confirms they have no connection to Lalo. When Jesse asks who Lalo is, Saul dismisses him as "nobody" without explaining any further.

=== Post-Breaking Bad ===
While Saul eventually learns through Gus, by way of Jesse, that the entire Salamanca family has died, even by 2010, he is still not entirely convinced of Lalo's demise, calling him "apparently" dead during a phone call with Kim. With Mike and Gus also dead, Kim confesses the true nature of Howard's death to prosecutors and to Howard's widow, Cheryl. She names Lalo as Howard's killer in her affidavit, but admits to Cheryl that although Cheryl has grounds for a wrongful death lawsuit, Kim will likely not face criminal prosecution as most of the witnesses are dead and the location of Lalo's and Howard's bodies remains unknown.

== Reception ==
The character Lalo Salamanca and Tony Dalton's performance have received critical acclaim; some critics deemed Lalo one of the best villains on television. Reviewing the episode that introduces Lalo, Alan Sepinwall of Rolling Stone said Dalton "makes a solid first impression in the role" and that he hoped for "more than filling in a blank most viewers had long since forgotten existed". Sepinwall called the final scene in "Bad Choice Road", in which Lalo confronts Jimmy and Kim, one of the best in the series. He praised the lead actors' performances, particularly those of Rhea Seehorn as Kim and Dalton as Lalo. Steve Greene of IndieWire, after comparing Lalo to the character Anton Chigurh in the film No Country for Old Men, noted Lalo has "the unpredictability of his impulsive, petulant [cousin] combined with the faux geniality of his chicken CEO rival" and praised Dalton's performance, who he says "makes that poisonous, affected smile work, especially when it's coupled with Lalo's blatant disregard for bodily harm". Brian Grubb of Uproxx wrote in his review of the season-five finale, "It is almost unreasonable how good a character Lalo is. To pull this off after five seasons of this show and the full run of Breaking Bad, to just up and introduce someone this charming and evil and perfect, is basically showing off".

== See also ==
- List of characters in the Breaking Bad franchise
