= List of awards and nominations received by Better Call Saul =

Better Call Saul awards and nominations
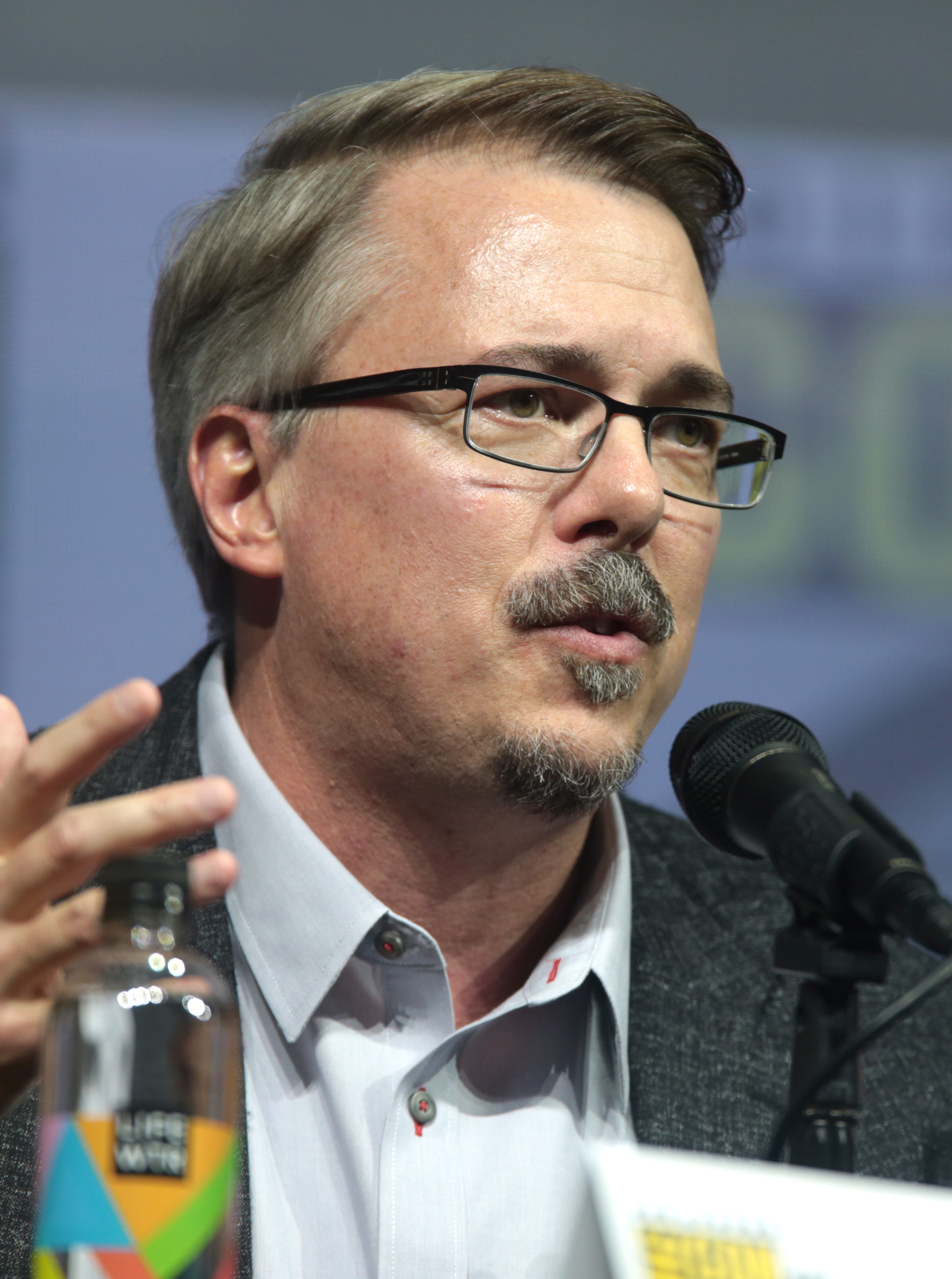
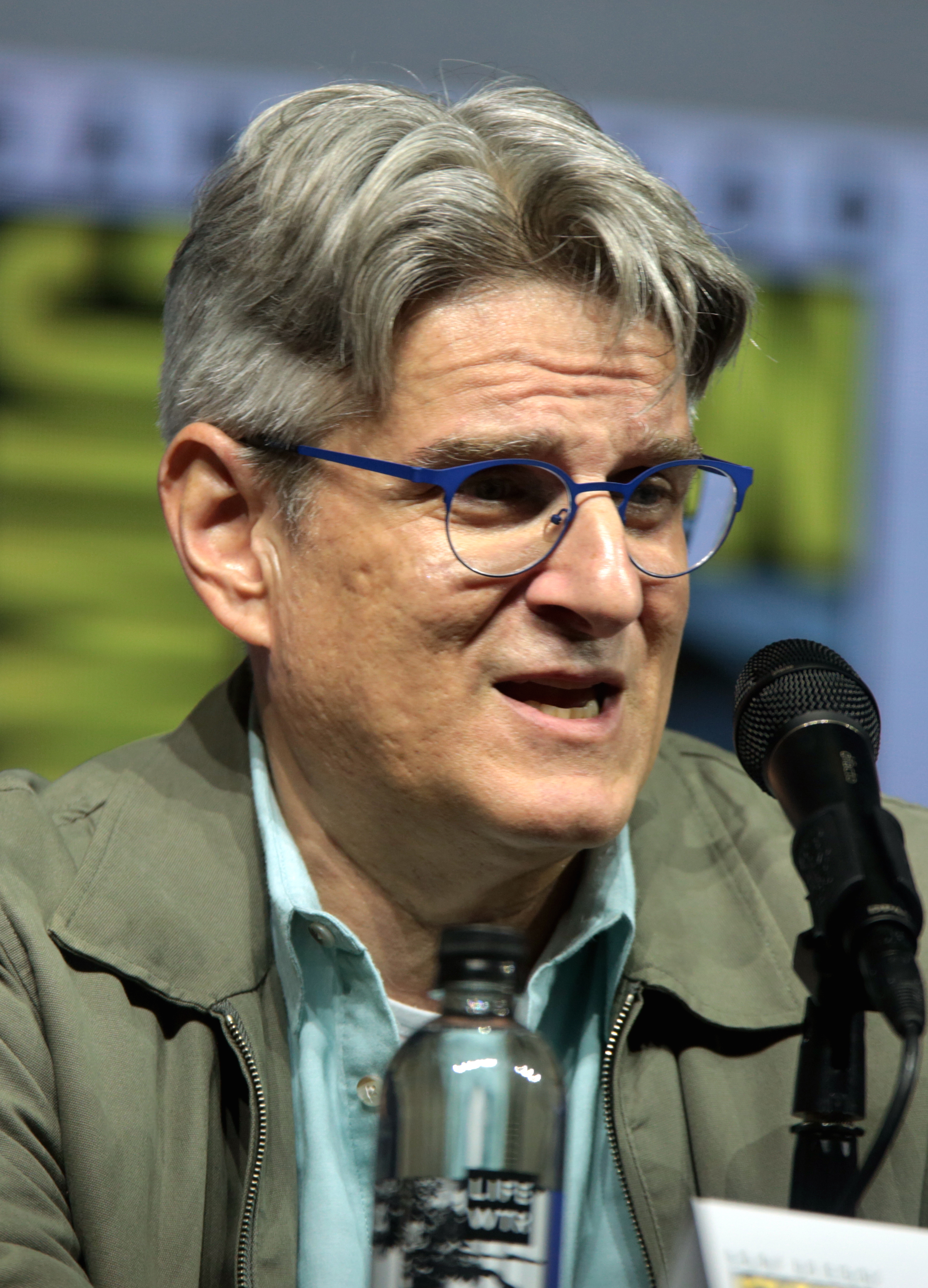
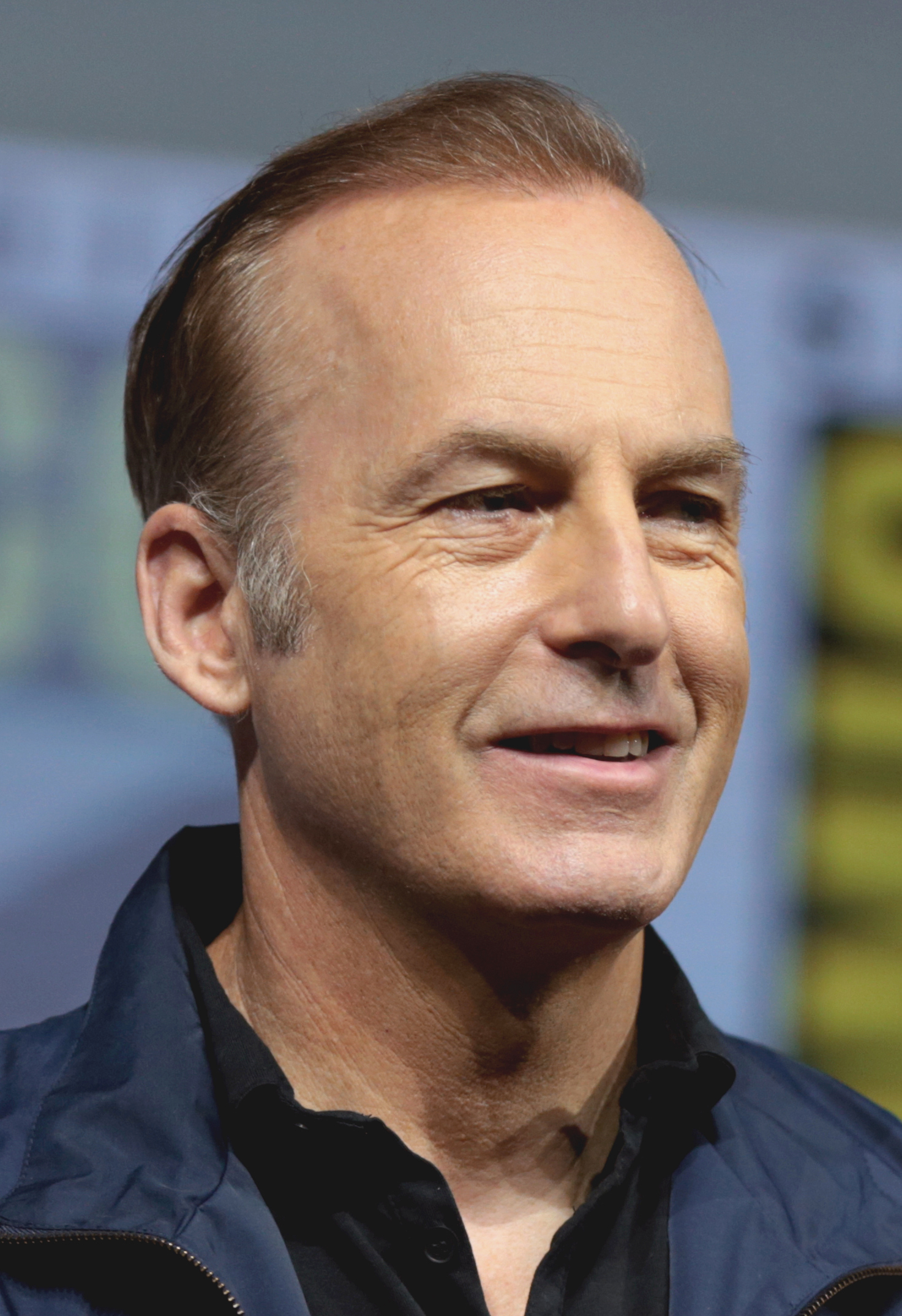
- From left to right: Series creators Vince Gilligan and Peter Gould, and series producer and actor Bob Odenkirk (Saul Goodman)
Awards and nominations
Award	Wins	Nominations
AACTA International Awards	0	1
Actor Awards	0	9
American Film Institute Awards	5	5
American Society of Cinematographers Awards	0	2
Art Directors Guild Awards	0	4
Artios Awards	0	2
Black Reel Awards for Television	0	3
Cinema Audio Society Awards	0	5
Creative Arts Emmy Awards	2	23
Critics' Choice Television Awards	4	20
Directors Guild of America Awards	0	1
Dorian Awards	0	3
Eddie Awards	1	10
Golden Globe Awards	0	6
Golden Reel Awards	0	9
Guild of Music Supervisors Awards	1	4
Hollywood Critics Association TV Awards	4	6
Location Managers Guild Awards	0	1
Peabody Awards	2	0
People's Choice Awards	0	2
Primetime Emmy Awards	0	30
Producers Guild of America Awards	0	6
Satellite Awards	6	12
Saturn Awards	5	19
TCA Awards	3	19
Writers Guild of America Awards	3	19

Totals (Note: Certain award groups do not simply award one winner. They acknowledge several different recipients, have runners-up, and have third place. Since this is a specific recognition and is different from losing an award, runner-up mentions are considered wins in this award tally. For simplification and to avoid errors, each award in this list has been presumed to have had a prior nomination.)
- Wins: 34
- Nominations: 192

Better Call Saul is an American television crime drama series created by Vince Gilligan and Peter Gould that premiered on AMC on February 8, 2015. It is a spin-off, prequel, and sequel of Gilligan's previous series, Breaking Bad. It stars Bob Odenkirk, Jonathan Banks, Rhea Seehorn, Patrick Fabian, Michael Mando, Michael McKean, Giancarlo Esposito, and Tony Dalton. Set in the early-to-mid-2000s in Albuquerque, New Mexico, the series develops Jimmy McGill (Odenkirk), an earnest lawyer and former con-man, into an egocentric criminal defense attorney known as Saul Goodman. After six seasons and a total of 63 episodes, the series concluded on August 15, 2022.

Since its release, Better Call Saul has received critical acclaim, with particular praise for its acting, characters, writing, direction, and cinematography. (Note: Season-by-season reception: The first season holds a 97% approval rating based on 291 reviews on Rotten Tomatoes and a score of 78 based on 43 reviews on Metacritic.; The second season holds a 97% approval rating based on 182 reviews on Rotten Tomatoes and a score of 85 based on 18 reviews on Metacritic.; The third season holds a 97% approval rating based on 175 reviews on Rotten Tomatoes and a score of 87 based on 18 reviews on Metacritic.; The fourth season holds a 99% approval rating based on 185 reviews on Rotten Tomatoes and a score of 87 based on 16 reviews on Metacritic.; The fifth season holds a 99% approval rating based on 184 reviews on Rotten Tomatoes and a score of 92 based on 16 reviews on Metacritic.; The sixth season holds a 99% approval rating based on 117 reviews on Rotten Tomatoes and a score of 94 based on 20 reviews on Metacritic.) The series has been nominated for numerous accolades, winning five awards for Television Program of the Year from the American Film Institute. For his performance as Jimmy McGill, Bob Odenkirk was nominated for five Golden Globes for Best Actor in a Television Series Drama. Rhea Seehorn's portrayal of Kim Wexler won her two Satellite Awards for Best Supporting Actress in a Series, Miniseries or Television Film, and one Saturn Award for Best Supporting Actress on Television.

For his work on the show, screenwriter Gordon Smith has been nominated for three Primetime Emmy Awards for Outstanding Writing for a Drama Series and two Writers Guild of America Awards for Best Episodic Drama. Additionally, Phillip W. Palmer, Larry Benjamin, and Kevin Valentine have all been nominated for three consecutive Creative Arts Emmy Awards for Outstanding Sound Mixing for a Comedy or Drama Series. Series creator Vince Gilligan has also received multiple nominations, including four for Producers Guild of America Awards for Best Episodic Drama, which he shared with various crew members of the show. Many critics have called Better Call Saul a worthy successor to Breaking Bad and one of the best prequels ever made. The series has garnered 55 nominations for Primetime and Creative Arts Emmy Awards, (Note: The Emmys website officially lists 0 wins from 53 nominations for Better Call Saul. However, the website does not include the episodic promotional material from AMC, two of which won Emmys and are included in this list.) 19 for Writers Guild of America Awards, 15 for Critics' Choice Television Awards, 12 for Satellite Awards, 9 for Actor Awards, and 6 for Golden Globes.

== Awards and nominations ==
Awards and nominations received by Better Call Saul
Award	Year (Note: The listed year refers to the date of the ceremony, not necessarily the year in which the corresponding season or episode aired.)	Category	Nominee(s)	Result	Ref.
AACTA International Awards	2022	Best Actor in a Series	Bob Odenkirk	Nominated	
American Film Institute Awards	2015	Television Programs of the Year	Better Call Saul	Won (Note: This award does not have a single winner, but recognizes multiple series.)	
American Film Institute Awards	2016	Television Programs of the Year	Better Call Saul	Won	
American Film Institute Awards	2018	Television Programs of the Year	Better Call Saul	Won	
American Film Institute Awards	2021	Television Programs of the Year	Better Call Saul	Won	
American Film Institute Awards	2022	Television Programs of the Year	Better Call Saul	Won	
American Society of Cinematographers Awards	2021	Outstanding Achievement in Cinematography in an Episode of a One-Hour Television Series – Commercial	Marshall Adams (for "Bagman")	Nominated	
American Society of Cinematographers Awards	2022	Outstanding Achievement in Cinematography in an Episode of a One-Hour Television Series – Commercial	Marshall Adams (for "Saul Gone")	Nominated	
Art Directors Guild Awards	2016	Excellence in Production Design for a One-Hour Contemporary Single-Camera Series	Tony Fanning (for "Five-O", "Marco", and "RICO")	Nominated	
Art Directors Guild Awards	2017	Excellence in Production Design for a One-Hour Contemporary Single-Camera Series	Tony Fanning (for "Inflatable", "Fifi", and "Klick")	Nominated	
Art Directors Guild Awards	2019	Excellence in Production Design for a One-Hour Contemporary Single-Camera Series	Judy Rhee (for "Piñata" and "Coushatta")	Nominated	
Art Directors Guild Awards	2023	Excellence in Production Design for a One-Hour Contemporary Single-Camera Series	Denise Pizzini (for "Wine and Roses" and "Nippy")	Nominated	
Artios Awards	2022	Outstanding Achievement in Casting – Television Drama Series	Sharon Bialy, Sherry Thomas, Russell Scott, Marie K. McMaster, and Alyssa Morris	Nominated	
Artios Awards	2024	Outstanding Achievement in Casting – Television Drama Series	Sharon Bialy, Sherry Thomas, Russell Scott, Marie K. McMaster, and Alyssa Morris	Nominated	
Black Reel Awards for Television	2022	Outstanding Supporting Actor, Drama Series	Giancarlo Esposito	Nominated	
Black Reel Awards for Television	2022	Outstanding Directing, Drama Series	Giancarlo Esposito (for "Axe and Grind")	Nominated	
Black Reel Awards for Television	2023	Outstanding Supporting Performance, Drama Series	Giancarlo Esposito	Won	
Cinema Audio Society Awards	2016	Outstanding Achievement in Sound Mixing for Television Series – One Hour	Phillip W. Palmer, Larry B. Benjamin, Kevin Valentine, Matt Hovland, and David Michael Torres (for "Marco")	Nominated	
Cinema Audio Society Awards	2017	Outstanding Achievement in Sound Mixing for Television Series – One Hour	Phillip W. Palmer, Larry B. Benjamin, Kevin Valentine, Matt Hovland, and David Michael Torres (for "Klick")	Nominated	
Cinema Audio Society Awards	2018	Outstanding Achievement in Sound Mixing for Television Series – One Hour	Phillip W. Palmer, Larry B. Benjamin, Kevin Valentine, Matt Hovland, and David Michael Torres (for "Lantern")	Nominated	
Cinema Audio Society Awards	2019	Outstanding Achievement in Sound Mixing for Television Series – One Hour	Phillip W. Palmer, Larry B. Benjamin, Kevin Valentine, Chris Navarro, and Stacey Michaels (for "Talk")	Nominated	
Cinema Audio Society Awards	2021	Outstanding Achievement in Sound Mixing for Television Series – One Hour	Phillip W. Palmer, Larry B. Benjamin, Kevin Valentine, Chris Navarro, and Stacey Michaels (for "Bagman")	Nominated	
Cinema Audio Society Awards	2023	Outstanding Achievement in Sound Mixing for Television Series – One Hour	Phillip W. Palmer, Larry Benjamin, Kevin Valentine, Chris Navarro, Stacey Michaels (for "Saul Gone")	Won	
Creative Arts Emmy Awards	2015	Outstanding Single-Camera Picture Editing for a Drama Series	Kelley Dixon (for "Five-O")	Nominated	
Creative Arts Emmy Awards	2015	Outstanding Single-Camera Picture Editing for a Drama Series	Kelley Dixon and Chris McCaleb (for "Marco")	Nominated	
Creative Arts Emmy Awards	2015	Outstanding Sound Mixing for a Comedy or Drama Series	Phillip W. Palmer, Larry Benjamin, and Kevin Valentine (for "Marco")	Nominated	
Creative Arts Emmy Awards	2016	Outstanding Single-Camera Picture Editing for a Drama Series	Kelley Dixon (for "Rebecca")	Nominated	
Creative Arts Emmy Awards	2016	Outstanding Single-Camera Picture Editing for a Drama Series	Kelley Dixon and Chris McCaleb (for "Nailed")	Nominated	
Creative Arts Emmy Awards	2016	Outstanding Sound Mixing for a Comedy or Drama Series	Phillip W. Palmer, Larry Benjamin, and Kevin Valentine (for "Klick")	Nominated	
Creative Arts Emmy Awards	2016	Outstanding Special Visual Effects	William Powloski, Eric Chauvin, and Erin Kanoa (for "Fifi")	Nominated	
Creative Arts Emmy Awards	2017	Outstanding Music Supervision	Thomas Golubić (for "Sunk Costs")	Nominated	
Creative Arts Emmy Awards	2017	Outstanding Single-Camera Picture Editing for a Drama Series	Skip Macdonald (for "Chicanery")	Nominated	
Creative Arts Emmy Awards	2017	Outstanding Single-Camera Picture Editing for a Drama Series	Kelley Dixon and Skip Macdonald (for "Witness")	Nominated	
Creative Arts Emmy Awards	2017	Outstanding Sound Mixing for a Comedy or Drama Series	Phillip W. Palmer, Larry Benjamin, and Kevin Valentine (for "Witness")	Nominated	
Creative Arts Emmy Awards	2017	Outstanding Short Form Comedy or Drama Series	Los Pollos Hermanos Employee Training	Won	
Creative Arts Emmy Awards	2019	Outstanding Guest Actor in a Drama Series	Michael McKean (for "Winner")	Nominated	
Creative Arts Emmy Awards	2019	Outstanding Music Supervision	Thomas Golubić (for "Something Stupid")	Nominated	
Creative Arts Emmy Awards	2019	Outstanding Sound Editing for a Comedy or Drama Series	Kurt Nicholas Forshager, Kathryn Madsen, Mark Cookson, Matt Temple, Jane Boegel-Koch, Jason Newman, Jeff Cranford, and Gregg Barbanell (for "Talk")	Nominated	
Creative Arts Emmy Awards	2019	Outstanding Sound Mixing for a Comedy or Drama Series	Larry Benjamin, Kevin Valentine, and Phillip W. Palmer (for "Talk")	Nominated	
Creative Arts Emmy Awards	2020	Outstanding Music Supervision	Thomas Golubić (for "The Guy for This")	Nominated	
Creative Arts Emmy Awards	2020	Outstanding Sound Editing for a Comedy or Drama Series	Nick Forshager, Kathryn Madsen, Matt Temple, Todd Toon, Jeff Cranford, Jane Boegel, Jason Newman, Gregg Barbanell, and Alex Ullrich (for "Bagman")	Nominated	
Creative Arts Emmy Awards	2020	Outstanding Sound Mixing for a Comedy or Drama Series	Phillip W. Palmer, Larry Benjamin, and Kevin Valentine (for "Bagman")	Nominated	
Creative Arts Emmy Awards	2020	Outstanding Short Form Comedy or Drama Series	Better Call Saul: Ethics Training with Kim Wexler	Won	
Creative Arts Emmy Awards	2022	Outstanding Music Supervision	Thomas Golubić (for "Black and Blue")	Nominated	
Creative Arts Emmy Awards	2022	Outstanding Sound Editing for a Comedy or Drama Series (One Hour)	Nick Forshager, Kathryn Madsen, Jane Boegel, Matt Temple, Marc Glassman, Jeff Cranford, Jason Tregoe Newman, Gregg Barbanell, and Alex Ullrich (for "Carrot and Stick")	Nominated	
Creative Arts Emmy Awards	2022	Outstanding Sound Mixing for a Comedy or Drama Series (One Hour)	Larry Benjamin, Kevin Valentine, and Philip W. Palmer (for "Carrot and Stick")	Nominated	
Creative Arts Emmy Awards	2024	Outstanding Short Form Comedy, Drama or Variety Series	Better Call Saul: Filmmaker Training	Nominated	
Creative Arts Emmy Awards	2024	Outstanding Picture Editing for a Drama Series	Skip Macdonald (for "Saul Gone")	Nominated	
Creative Arts Emmy Awards	2024	Outstanding Sound Mixing for a Comedy or Drama Series (One-Hour)	Larry Benjamin, Kevin Valentine, Phillip W. Palmer (for "Saul Gone")	Nominated	
Critics' Choice Television Awards	2015	Best Actor in a Drama Series	Bob Odenkirk	Won	
Critics' Choice Television Awards	2015	Best Supporting Actor in a Drama Series	Jonathan Banks	Won	
Critics' Choice Television Awards	2016	Best Drama Series	Better Call Saul	Nominated	
Critics' Choice Television Awards	2016	Best Actor in a Drama Series	Bob Odenkirk	Won	
Critics' Choice Television Awards	2016	Best Supporting Actor in a Drama Series	Michael McKean	Nominated	
Critics' Choice Television Awards	2018	Best Actor in a Drama Series	Bob Odenkirk	Nominated	
Critics' Choice Television Awards	2018	Best Supporting Actor in a Drama Series	Michael McKean	Nominated	
Critics' Choice Television Awards	2019	Best Drama Series	Better Call Saul	Nominated	
Critics' Choice Television Awards	2019	Best Actor in a Drama Series	Bob Odenkirk	Nominated	
Critics' Choice Television Awards	2019	Best Supporting Actress in a Drama Series	Rhea Seehorn	Nominated	
Critics' Choice Television Awards	2021	Best Drama Series	Better Call Saul	Nominated	
Critics' Choice Television Awards	2021	Best Actor in a Drama Series	Bob Odenkirk	Nominated	
Critics' Choice Television Awards	2021	Best Supporting Actor in a Drama Series	Jonathan Banks	Nominated	
Critics' Choice Television Awards	2021	Best Supporting Actress in a Drama Series	Rhea Seehorn	Nominated	
Critics' Choice Television Awards	2021	Best Short Form Series	Employee Training: Legal Ethics with Kim Wexler	Won	
Critics' Choice Television Awards	2023	Best Drama Series	Better Call Saul	Won	
Critics' Choice Television Awards	2023	Best Actor in a Drama Series	Bob Odenkirk	Won	
Critics' Choice Television Awards	2023	Best Supporting Actor in a Drama Series	Giancarlo Esposito	Won	
Critics' Choice Television Awards	2023	Best Supporting Actress in a Drama Series	Carol Burnett	Nominated	
Critics' Choice Television Awards	2023	Best Supporting Actress in a Drama Series	Rhea Seehorn	Nominated	
Directors Guild of America Awards	2021	Outstanding Directing – Drama Series	Vince Gilligan (for "Bagman")	Nominated	
Directors Guild of America Awards	2023	Outstanding Directing – Drama Series	Vince Gilligan (for "Waterworks")	Nominated	
Dorian Awards	2020	Best TV Drama	Better Call Saul	Nominated	
Dorian Awards	2022	Best TV Drama	Better Call Saul	Nominated	
Dorian Awards	2022	Best Supporting TV Performance	Rhea Seehorn	Nominated	
Eddie Awards	2016	Best Edited One-Hour Series for Commercial Television	Kelley Dixon (for "Five-O")	Nominated	
Eddie Awards	2016	Best Edited One-Hour Series for Commercial Television	Skip Macdonald (for "Uno")	Nominated	
Eddie Awards	2017	Best Edited One-Hour Series for Commercial Television	Skip Macdonald (for "Fifi")	Nominated	
Eddie Awards	2017	Best Edited One-Hour Series for Commercial Television	Skip Macdonald and Curtis Thurber (for "Klick")	Nominated	
Eddie Awards	2017	Best Edited One-Hour Series for Commercial Television	Kelley Dixon and Chris McCaleb (for "Nailed")	Nominated	
Eddie Awards	2018	Best Edited Drama Series for Commercial Television	Skip Macdonald (for "Chicanery")	Nominated	
Eddie Awards	2018	Best Edited Drama Series for Commercial Television	Kelley Dixon and Skip Macdonald (for "Witness")	Nominated	
Eddie Awards	2019	Best Edited Drama Series for Commercial Television	Skip Macdonald (for "Something Stupid")	Nominated	
Eddie Awards	2019	Best Edited Drama Series for Commercial Television	Chris McCaleb (for "Winner")	Nominated	
Eddie Awards	2021	Best Edited Drama Series for Commercial Television	Joey Liew and Chris McCaleb (for "Bad Choice Road")	Won	
Golden Globe Awards	2016	Best Actor – Television Series Drama	Bob Odenkirk	Nominated	
Golden Globe Awards	2017	Best Actor – Television Series Drama	Bob Odenkirk	Nominated	
Golden Globe Awards	2018	Best Actor – Television Series Drama	Bob Odenkirk	Nominated	
Golden Globe Awards	2021	Best Actor – Television Series Drama	Bob Odenkirk	Nominated	
Golden Globe Awards	2023	Best Television Series – Drama	Better Call Saul	Nominated	
Golden Globe Awards	2023	Best Actor – Television Series Drama	Bob Odenkirk	Nominated	
Golden Reel Awards	2016	Outstanding Achievement in Sound Editing – Sound Effects and Foley for Episodic Short Form Broadcast Media	Nick Forshager	Nominated	
Golden Reel Awards	2017	Outstanding Achievement in Sound Editing – Sound Effects and Foley for Episodic Short Form Broadcast Media	Kurt Nicholas Forshager, Mark Cookson, Jeffrey Cranford, Tim Chilton, and Jerry Trent (for "Nailed")	Nominated	
Golden Reel Awards	2019	Outstanding Achievement in Sound Editing – Dialogue and ADR for Episodic Short Form Broadcast Media	Kurt Nicholas Forshager, Kathryn Madsen, and Jane Boegel (for "Talk")	Nominated	
Golden Reel Awards	2019	Outstanding Achievement in Sound Editing – Dialogue and ADR for Episodic Long Form Broadcast Media	Kurt Nicholas Forshager, Kathryn Madsen, and Jane Boegel (for "Winner")	Nominated	
Golden Reel Awards	2021	Outstanding Achievement in Sound Editing - Music Score and Musical for Episodic Long Form Broadcast Media	Jason Tregoe Newman (for "Magic Man")	Nominated	
Golden Reel Awards	2021	Outstanding Achievement in Sound Editing – Dialogue and ADR for Episodic Long Form Broadcast Media	Nick Forshager, Kathryn Madsen, and Jane Boegel (for "Something Unforgivable")	Nominated	
Golden Reel Awards	2021	Outstanding Achievement in Sound Editing – Sound Effects and Foley for Episodic Long Form Broadcast Media	Nick Forshager, Kathryn Madsen, Todd Toon, Matt Temple, Jeff Cranford, Gregg Barbanell, and Alex Ulrich (for "Bagman")	Nominated	
Golden Reel Awards	2023	Outstanding Achievement in Sound Editing – Broadcast Long Form Dialogue and ADR	Nick Forshager, Kathryn Madsen, and Jane Boegel (for "Saul Gone")	Nominated	
Golden Reel Awards	2023	Outstanding Achievement in Sound Editing – Broadcast Long Form Effects and Foley	Nick Forshager, Kathryn Madsen, Matt Temple, Gregg Barbanell, and Alex Ullrich (for "Carrot and Stick")	Nominated	
Guild of Music Supervisors Awards	2016	Best Music Supervision in a Television Drama	Thomas Golubić	Nominated	
Guild of Music Supervisors Awards	2018	Best Music Supervision in a Television Drama	Thomas Golubić	Nominated	
Guild of Music Supervisors Awards	2020	Best Song Written and/or Recorded for Television	C. Carson Parks, Lola Marsh, and Thomas Golubić	Won	
Guild of Music Supervisors Awards	2021	Best Music Supervision in a Television Drama	Thomas Golubić	Nominated	
Hollywood Critics Association Creative Arts TV Awards	2023	Best Guest Actor in a Drama Series	Bryan Cranston	Nominated	
Hollywood Critics Association TV Awards	2022	Best Cable Series, Drama	Better Call Saul	Won (Note: Tied with Succession)	
Hollywood Critics Association TV Awards	2022	Best Actor in a Broadcast Network or Cable Series, Drama	Bob Odenkirk	Won	
Hollywood Critics Association TV Awards	2022	Best Supporting Actor in a Broadcast Network or Cable Series, Drama	Giancarlo Esposito	Won	
Hollywood Critics Association TV Awards	2022	Best Supporting Actor in a Broadcast Network or Cable Series, Drama	Jonathan Banks	Nominated	
Hollywood Critics Association TV Awards	2022	Best Supporting Actor in a Broadcast Network or Cable Series, Drama	Michael Mando	Nominated	
Hollywood Critics Association TV Awards	2022	Best Supporting Actress in a Broadcast Network or Cable Series, Drama	Rhea Seehorn	Won	
Hollywood Critics Association TV Awards	2023	Best Cable Series, Drama	Better Call Saul	Nominated	
Hollywood Critics Association TV Awards	2023	Best Actor in a Broadcast Network or Cable Series, Drama	Bob Odenkirk	Nominated	
Hollywood Critics Association TV Awards	2023	Best Supporting Actor in a Broadcast Network or Cable Series, Drama	Jonathan Banks	Nominated	
Hollywood Critics Association TV Awards	2023	Best Supporting Actress in a Broadcast Network or Cable Series, Drama	Rhea Seehorn	Won	
Location Managers Guild Awards	2017	Outstanding Locations in a Contemporary TV Series	Better Call Saul	Nominated	
Peabody Awards	2018	Entertainment, children's and youth honorees	Better Call Saul	Won	
Peabody Awards	2023	Entertainment honorees	Better Call Saul	Won	
People's Choice Awards	2022	The Show of 2022	Better Call Saul	Nominated	
People's Choice Awards	2022	The Drama Show of 2022	Better Call Saul	Nominated	
Primetime Emmy Awards	2015	Outstanding Drama Series	Better Call Saul	Nominated	
Primetime Emmy Awards	2015	Outstanding Lead Actor in a Drama Series	Bob Odenkirk (for "Pimento")	Nominated	
Primetime Emmy Awards	2015	Outstanding Supporting Actor in a Drama Series	Jonathan Banks (for "Five-O")	Nominated	
Primetime Emmy Awards	2015	Outstanding Writing for a Drama Series	Gordon Smith (for "Five-O")	Nominated	
Primetime Emmy Awards	2016	Outstanding Drama Series	Better Call Saul	Nominated	
Primetime Emmy Awards	2016	Outstanding Lead Actor in a Drama Series	Bob Odenkirk (for "Klick")	Nominated	
Primetime Emmy Awards	2016	Outstanding Supporting Actor in a Drama Series	Jonathan Banks (for "Bali Ha'i")	Nominated	
Primetime Emmy Awards	2017	Outstanding Drama Series	Better Call Saul	Nominated	
Primetime Emmy Awards	2017	Outstanding Lead Actor in a Drama Series	Bob Odenkirk (for "Expenses")	Nominated	
Primetime Emmy Awards	2017	Outstanding Supporting Actor in a Drama Series	Jonathan Banks (for "Witness")	Nominated	
Primetime Emmy Awards	2017	Outstanding Directing for a Drama Series	Vince Gilligan (for "Witness")	Nominated	
Primetime Emmy Awards	2017	Outstanding Writing for a Drama Series	Gordon Smith (for "Chicanery")	Nominated	
Primetime Emmy Awards	2019	Outstanding Drama Series	Better Call Saul	Nominated	
Primetime Emmy Awards	2019	Outstanding Lead Actor in a Drama Series	Bob Odenkirk (for "Winner")	Nominated	
Primetime Emmy Awards	2019	Outstanding Supporting Actor in a Drama Series	Jonathan Banks (for "Winner")	Nominated	
Primetime Emmy Awards	2019	Outstanding Supporting Actor in a Drama Series	Giancarlo Esposito (for "Piñata")	Nominated	
Primetime Emmy Awards	2019	Outstanding Writing for a Drama Series	Thomas Schnauz and Peter Gould (for "Winner")	Nominated	
Primetime Emmy Awards	2020	Outstanding Drama Series	Better Call Saul	Nominated	
Primetime Emmy Awards	2020	Outstanding Supporting Actor in a Drama Series	Giancarlo Esposito (for "JMM")	Nominated	
Primetime Emmy Awards	2020	Outstanding Writing for a Drama Series	Thomas Schnauz (for "Bad Choice Road")	Nominated	
Primetime Emmy Awards	2020	Outstanding Writing for a Drama Series	Gordon Smith (for "Bagman")	Nominated	
Primetime Emmy Awards	2022	Outstanding Drama Series	Better Call Saul	Nominated	
Primetime Emmy Awards	2022	Outstanding Lead Actor in a Drama Series	Bob Odenkirk (for "Plan and Execution")	Nominated	
Primetime Emmy Awards	2022	Outstanding Supporting Actress in a Drama Series	Rhea Seehorn (for "Hit and Run")	Nominated	
Primetime Emmy Awards	2022	Outstanding Writing for a Drama Series	Thomas Schnauz (for "Plan and Execution")	Nominated	
Primetime Emmy Awards	2023	Outstanding Drama Series	Better Call Saul	Nominated	
Primetime Emmy Awards	2023	Outstanding Lead Actor in a Drama Series	Bob Odenkirk (for "Saul Gone")	Nominated	
Primetime Emmy Awards	2023	Outstanding Supporting Actress in a Drama Series	Rhea Seehorn (for "Waterworks")	Nominated	
Primetime Emmy Awards	2023	Outstanding Writing for a Drama Series	Gordon Smith (for "Point and Shoot")	Nominated	
Primetime Emmy Awards	2023	Outstanding Writing for a Drama Series	Peter Gould (for "Saul Gone")	Nominated	
Producers Guild of America Awards	2016	Best Episodic Drama	Vince Gilligan, Peter Gould, Melissa Bernstein, Mark Johnson, Stewart A. Lyons, Thomas Schnauz, Gennifer Hutchison, Nina Jack, Diane Mercer, and Bob Odenkirk	Nominated	
Producers Guild of America Awards	2017	Best Episodic Drama	Vince Gilligan, Peter Gould, Melissa Bernstein, Mark Johnson, Thomas Schnauz, Gennifer Hutchison, Nina Jack, Robin Sweet, Diane Mercer, and Bob Odenkirk	Nominated	
Producers Guild of America Awards	2018	Outstanding Short-Form Program	Los Pollos Hermanos Employee Training	Nominated	
Producers Guild of America Awards	2019	Best Episodic Drama	Vince Gilligan, Peter Gould, Mark Johnson, Melissa Bernstein, Thomas Schnauz, Gennifer Hutchison, Nina Jack, Diane Mercer, Gordon Smith, Alison Tatlock, Ann Cherkis, Bob Odenkirk, and Robin Sweet	Nominated	
Producers Guild of America Awards	2021	Best Episodic Drama	Better Call Saul	Nominated	
Producers Guild of America Awards	2021	Outstanding Short-Form Program	Employee Training: Legal Ethics with Kim Wexler	Nominated	
Producers Guild of America Awards	2023	Outstanding Short-Form Program	Better Call Saul: Filmmaker Training	Nominated	
Producers Guild of America Awards	2023	Best Episodic Drama	Better Call Saul	Nominated	
Satellite Awards	2016	Best Television Series – Drama	Better Call Saul	Won	
Satellite Awards	2016	Best Actor – Television Series Drama	Bob Odenkirk	Nominated	
Satellite Awards	2016	Best Supporting Actor – Series, Miniseries or Television Film	Jonathan Banks	Nominated	
Satellite Awards	2016	Best Supporting Actress – Series, Miniseries or Television Film	Rhea Seehorn	Won	
Satellite Awards	2017	Best Television Series – Drama	Better Call Saul	Nominated	
Satellite Awards	2017	Best Actor – Television Series Drama	Bob Odenkirk	Nominated	
Satellite Awards	2017	Best Supporting Actor – Series, Miniseries or Television Film	Jonathan Banks	Nominated	
Satellite Awards	2017	Best Supporting Actress – Series, Miniseries or Television Film	Rhea Seehorn	Won (Note: Tied with Olivia Colman from The Night Manager)	
Satellite Awards	2018	Best Supporting Actor – Series, Miniseries or Television Film	Michael McKean	Won	
Satellite Awards	2019	Best Actor – Television Series Drama	Bob Odenkirk	Nominated	
Satellite Awards	2021	Best Television Series – Drama	Better Call Saul	Won	
Satellite Awards	2021	Best Actor – Television Series Drama	Bob Odenkirk	Won	
Satellite Awards	2023	Best Television Series – Drama	Better Call Saul	Nominated	
Satellite Awards	2023	Best Actor – Television Series Drama	Bob Odenkirk	Won	
Satellite Awards	2023	Best Supporting Actor – Series, Miniseries or Television Film	Giancarlo Esposito	Nominated	
Satellite Awards	2023	Best Actress – Television Series Drama	Rhea Seehorn	Nominated	
Saturn Awards	2018	Best Action-Thriller Television Series	Better Call Saul	Won	
Saturn Awards	2018	Best Supporting Actor on Television	Michael McKean	Won	
Saturn Awards	2018	Best Supporting Actress on Television	Rhea Seehorn	Won	
Saturn Awards	2019	Best Action-Thriller Television Series	Better Call Saul	Won	
Saturn Awards	2019	Best Supporting Actor on Television	Jonathan Banks	Nominated	
Saturn Awards	2019	Best Supporting Actress on Television	Rhea Seehorn	Nominated	
Saturn Awards	2019	Best Guest Starring Role on Television	Rainer Bock	Nominated	
Saturn Awards	2021	Best Action-Thriller Television Series	Better Call Saul	Won	
Saturn Awards	2021	Best Actor on Television	Bob Odenkirk	Nominated	
Saturn Awards	2021	Best Actress on Television	Rhea Seehorn	Nominated	
Saturn Awards	2021	Best Supporting Actor on Television	Jonathan Banks	Nominated	
Saturn Awards	2021	Best Supporting Actor on Television	Tony Dalton	Nominated	
Saturn Awards	2022	Best Network or Cable Action/Thriller Television Series	Better Call Saul	Won	
Saturn Awards	2022	Best Actor in a Network or Cable Television Series	Bob Odenkirk	Won	
Saturn Awards	2022	Best Actress in a Network or Cable Television Series	Rhea Seehorn	Won	
Saturn Awards	2022	Best Supporting Actor in a Network or Cable Television Series	Jonathan Banks	Won	
Saturn Awards	2022	Best Supporting Actor in a Network or Cable Television Series	Tony Dalton	Nominated	
Saturn Awards	2022	Best Supporting Actor in a Network or Cable Television Series	Patrick Fabian	Nominated	
Saturn Awards	2022	Best Supporting Actor in a Network or Cable Television Series	Michael Mando	Nominated	
Saturn Awards	2024	Best Television Home Media Release	Better Call Saul (The Complete Collection)	Nominated	
Screen Actors Guild Awards	2016	Outstanding Performance by a Male Actor in a Drama Series	Bob Odenkirk	Nominated	
Screen Actors Guild Awards	2018	Outstanding Performance by a Male Actor in a Drama Series	Bob Odenkirk	Nominated	
Screen Actors Guild Awards	2019	Outstanding Performance by a Male Actor in a Drama Series	Bob Odenkirk	Nominated	
Screen Actors Guild Awards	2019	Outstanding Performance by an Ensemble in a Drama Series	Jonathan Banks, Rainer Bock, Ray Campbell, Giancarlo Esposito, Michael Mando, Bob Odenkirk, and Rhea Seehorn	Nominated	
Screen Actors Guild Awards	2021	Outstanding Performance by an Ensemble in a Drama Series	Jonathan Banks, Tony Dalton, Giancarlo Esposito, Patrick Fabian, Michael Mando, Bob Odenkirk, and Rhea Seehorn	Nominated	
Screen Actors Guild Awards	2021	Outstanding Performance by a Male Actor in a Drama Series	Bob Odenkirk	Nominated	
Screen Actors Guild Awards	2023	Outstanding Performance by a Male Actor in a Drama Series	Jonathan Banks	Nominated	
Screen Actors Guild Awards	2023	Outstanding Performance by a Male Actor in a Drama Series	Bob Odenkirk	Nominated	
Screen Actors Guild Awards	2023	Outstanding Performance by an Ensemble in a Drama Series	Jonathan Banks, Ed Begley Jr., Tony Dalton, Giancarlo Esposito, Patrick Fabian, Bob Odenkirk, and Rhea Seehorn	Nominated	
TCA Awards	2015	Outstanding New Program	Better Call Saul	Won	
TCA Awards	2015	Individual Achievement in Drama	Bob Odenkirk	Nominated	
TCA Awards	2016	Outstanding Achievement in Drama	Better Call Saul	Nominated	
TCA Awards	2016	Individual Achievement in Drama	Bob Odenkirk	Nominated	
TCA Awards	2017	Outstanding Achievement in Drama	Better Call Saul	Nominated	
TCA Awards	2019	Outstanding Achievement in Drama	Better Call Saul	Won	
TCA Awards	2020	Program of the Year	Better Call Saul	Nominated	
TCA Awards	2020	Outstanding Achievement in Drama	Better Call Saul	Nominated	
TCA Awards	2020	Individual Achievement in Drama	Rhea Seehorn	Nominated	
TCA Awards	2022	Program of the Year	Better Call Saul	Nominated	
TCA Awards	2022	Outstanding Achievement in Drama	Better Call Saul	Nominated	
TCA Awards	2022	Individual Achievement in Drama	Bob Odenkirk	Nominated	
TCA Awards	2022	Individual Achievement in Drama	Rhea Seehorn	Nominated	
TCA Awards	2023	Program of the Year	Better Call Saul	Nominated	
TCA Awards	2023	Outstanding Achievement in Drama	Better Call Saul	Nominated	
TCA Awards	2023	Individual Achievement in Drama	Rhea Seehorn	Won	
Writers Guild of America Awards	2016	Drama Series	Better Call Saul	Nominated	
Writers Guild of America Awards	2016	New Series	Better Call Saul	Nominated	
Writers Guild of America Awards	2016	Episodic Drama	Vince Gilligan and Peter Gould (for "Uno")	Won	
Writers Guild of America Awards	2017	Drama Series	Better Call Saul	Nominated	
Writers Guild of America Awards	2017	Episodic Drama	Gordon Smith (for "Gloves Off")	Nominated	
Writers Guild of America Awards	2017	Episodic Drama	Heather Marion and Vince Gilligan (for "Klick")	Nominated	
Writers Guild of America Awards	2017	Episodic Drama	Thomas Schnauz (for "Switch")	Nominated	
Writers Guild of America Awards	2018	Drama Series	Better Call Saul	Nominated	
Writers Guild of America Awards	2018	Episodic Drama	Gordon Smith (for "Chicanery")	Won	
Writers Guild of America Awards	2018	Episodic Drama	Heather Marion (for "Slip")	Nominated	
Writers Guild of America Awards	2019	Drama Series	Better Call Saul	Nominated	
Writers Guild of America Awards	2021	Drama Series	Better Call Saul	Nominated	
Writers Guild of America Awards	2021	Episodic Drama	Thomas Schnauz (for "Bad Choice Road")	Nominated	
Writers Guild of America Awards	2021	Episodic Drama	Alison Tatlock (for "JMM")	Nominated	
Writers Guild of America Awards	2021	Episodic Drama	Peter Gould and Ariel Levine (for "Something Unforgivable")	Nominated	
Writers Guild of America Awards	2021	Short Form New Media – Original	Employee Training: Legal Ethics with Kim Wexler	Nominated	
Writers Guild of America Awards	2023	Drama Series	Better Call Saul	Nominated	
Writers Guild of America Awards	2023	Episodic Drama	Thomas Schnauz (for "Plan and Execution")	Won	
Writers Guild of America Awards	2023	Episodic Drama	Gordon Smith (for "Rock and Hard Place")	Nominated	

== See also ==
- List of awards and nominations received by Breaking Bad
- List of accolades received by El Camino: A Breaking Bad Movie
