= Kelley Dixon =

American editor

- Occupations: Film and television editor
- Years active: 1990–present
- Awards: Primetime Emmy Award for Outstanding Single-Camera Picture Editing for a Drama Series (2013)

Kelley Dixon is an American film and television editor known for her work on Breaking Bad (2008–2013) and its spin-off series Better Call Saul (2015–2022). She also edited the film Black Panther: Wakanda Forever and several episodes of the TV series The Walking Dead and Shameless.

In 2013, she became the fourth member of Breaking Bad show's cast and crew to win an Emmy award. She has received ten Primetime Emmy Award nominations, winning once in 2013.

== Career ==
Dixon graduated from Colorado State University before moving to Los Angeles. She began editing professionally in 1990 as an assistant editor on feature films, including Good Will Hunting and Reservoir Dogs, and on thirteen episodes of the police drama TV series Without a Trace.

As primary editor, she is known for her work between 2008 and 2017, including sixteen episodes of Better Call Saul, twenty-seven episodes of Breaking Bad from 2008 to 2013, five episodes of The Walking Dead, and seven episodes of Shameless.

In Breaking Bad, she began work as an assistant to Lynne Willingham. She was elevated to being a full editor and for most of the show's run has split editing duties with Skip Macdonald.

In 2013, at the 65th Primetime Emmy Awards, she won the Primetime Emmy Award for Outstanding Picture Editing for a Drama Series for the Breaking Bad series episode Gliding Over All. She was nominated four times for her editing on Breaking Bad, including the 2013 win, and her work on Better Call Saul earned her five Emmy nominations. In 2022, she was nominated for the Primetime Emmy Award for Outstanding Picture Editing for a Limited or Anthology Series or Movie for Obi-Wan Kenobi.

== Accolades ==
Awards and nominations received by Kelley Dixon
Award	Year (Note: The listed year refers to the date of the ceremony, not necessarily the year in which the corresponding season or episode aired.)	Category	Series	Work	Result	Ref.
Primetime Emmy Awards	2012	Outstanding Single-Camera Picture Editing for a Drama Series	Breaking Bad	"End Times"	Nominated	
Primetime Emmy Awards	2013	Outstanding Single-Camera Picture Editing for a Drama Series	Breaking Bad	"Gliding Over All"	Won	
Primetime Emmy Awards	2014	Outstanding Single-Camera Picture Editing for a Drama Series	Breaking Bad	"Tohajillee"	Nominated	
Primetime Emmy Awards	2014	Outstanding Single-Camera Picture Editing for a Drama Series	Breaking Bad	"Granite State"	Nominated	
Primetime Emmy Awards	2015	Outstanding Single-Camera Picture Editing for a Drama Series	Better Call Saul	"Five-O"	Nominated	
Primetime Emmy Awards	2015	Outstanding Single-Camera Picture Editing for a Drama Series	Better Call Saul	"Marco"	Nominated	
Primetime Emmy Awards	2016	Outstanding Single-Camera Picture Editing for a Drama Series	Better Call Saul	"Nailed"	Nominated	
Primetime Emmy Awards	2016	Outstanding Single-Camera Picture Editing for a Drama Series	Better Call Saul	"Rebecca"	Nominated	
Primetime Emmy Awards	2017	Outstanding Single-Camera Picture Editing for a Drama Series	Better Call Saul	"Witness"	Nominated	
Primetime Emmy Awards	2023	Outstanding Picture Editing For A Limited Or Anthology Series Or Movie	Obi-Wan Kenobi	"Part VI"	Nominated	

== See also ==
- List of Primetime Emmy Award winners
