= Klick (Better Call Saul) =

- Better Call Saul episode
- Episode no.: Season 2 Episode 10
- Directed by: Vince Gilligan
- Written by: Heather Marion; Vince Gilligan
- Editing by: Skip Macdonald
- Original air date: April 18, 2016
- Running time: 48 minutes

Guest appearances
- Jim Beaver as Lawson; Clea DuVall as Dr. Lara Cruz; Manuel Uriza as Ximenez Lecerda; Luis Moncada as Marco Salamanca; Daniel Moncada as Leonel Salamanca; Carol Herman as Geraldine Strauss; Elisha Yaffe as Lance; Eli Goodman as Dr. Topolski; Liana Mendoza as Dr. Tricia; John Christian Love as Ernesto; Vincent Fuentes as Arturo Colon; Patty Figel as Ruth McGill; Robert Grossman as Theodore "Fudge" Talbott; Mark Margolis as Hector Salamanca

Episode chronology
← Previous "Nailed"	Next → "Mabel"
- Better Call Saul season 2

"Klick" is the tenth and final episode of the second season of the AMC television series Better Call Saul, a spin-off series of Breaking Bad. The episode aired on April 18, 2016, on AMC in the United States. Outside of the United States, the episode premiered on streaming service Netflix in several countries.

== Plot ==
=== Opening ===
In a flashback to 1999, Chuck McGill and Jimmy McGill have kept a vigil of several days at their mother’s hospital bed. Jimmy leaves to buy sandwiches and while he is gone, his mother wakes and calls Jimmy's name twice before dying. After Jimmy returns, Chuck tells Jimmy their mother has died and falsely claims she had no last words.

=== Main story ===
Chuck falls unconscious after hitting his head at the copy store. (Note: As seen in "Nailed".) Jimmy rushes in to give first aid and tells the clerk to call an ambulance. In the hospital, Chuck correctly deduces that Jimmy bribed the clerk to lie and that is why he was at the copy store. Ernesto covers for Jimmy by claiming that out of concern for Chuck's health, he called Jimmy before bringing Chuck to the copy store.

Jimmy refuses to have Chuck committed to psychiatric care but takes temporary guardianship and allows an MRI and a CAT scan to determine whether he suffered head or neck injuries. The doctor treating Chuck tells Jimmy that Chuck is healthy but has entered a self-induced catatonic state because of the medical tests. When Chuck returns to consciousness, Jimmy informs him of the test results and takes him home.

Mike Ehrmantraut purchases a rifle to use in killing Hector Salamanca. He positions himself on a ridge overlooking a desert site where Hector and his crew are preparing to execute Ximenez Lecerda, (Note: The driver whose truck Mike robbed, as seen in "Nailed".) but Mike is unable to get a clear shot because Nacho Varga is in the way. Suddenly from behind him, Mike hears his car horn blaring, so leaves to investigate. He finds a branch wedged against the horn and a note on the windshield with a single word: "DON'T".

Howard Hamlin tells Jimmy that Chuck is acting erratically, and Jimmy rushes to Chuck's house, where he finds that Chuck has plastered the walls with reflective space blankets. Chuck claims that he needs protection from ambient electromagnetic waves, which he blames for the transposing error on the Mesa Verde documents, and adds that he needs to retire as he is mentally unfit. To calm Chuck, Jimmy admits that he tampered with the documents (Note: As seen in "Fifi".) and bribed the clerk to keep quiet. When Jimmy leaves, Chuck unveils a tape recorder which was recording while Jimmy was present.

== Production ==
Series co-creator Vince Gilligan revealed that he wanted to have Breaking Bad actress Betsy Brandt (Marie Schrader) make a cameo appearance in the episode, but the writer's room objected, considering the idea to be distracting for audiences.

== Reception ==
=== Ratings ===
When first aired, the episode had 2.26 million viewers in the United States, and an 18–49 rating of 0.8.

Including DVR playback, the finale was watched by 4.78 million viewers.

=== Critical reception ===
The episode received acclaim from critics. It holds a perfect 100% positive rating with an average score of 9.16 out of 10 on the review aggregator Rotten Tomatoes. The critics' consensus reads: "Subtle but with detail-oriented precision, 'Klick' further scrutinizes the complex relationship between the brothers McGill while setting the stage for a potent next season." Bob Odenkirk received a nomination for Primetime Emmy Award for Outstanding Lead Actor in a Drama Series for his performance in this episode, while Phillip W. Palmer, Larry Benjamin, and Kevin Valentine were nominated for Outstanding Sound Mixing for a Comedy or Drama Series (One Hour).
