= Switch (Better Call Saul) =

- Better Call Saul episode
- Episode no.: Season 2 Episode 1
- Directed by: Thomas Schnauz
- Written by: Thomas Schnauz
- Original air date: February 15, 2016
- Running time: 47 minutes

Guest appearances
- Ed Begley, Jr. as Clifford Main; Mark Proksch as Daniel "Pryce" Wormald; Kyle Bornheimer as Ken; Stoney Westmoreland as Officer Saxton; Jessie Ennis as Erin Brill; Omar Maskati as Omar; Eileen Fogarty as Mrs. Nguyen; Alex Désert as Officer Baker

Episode chronology
← Previous "Marco"	Next → "Cobbler"
- Better Call Saul season 2

"Switch" is the second season premiere of the AMC television series Better Call Saul, the spinoff series of Breaking Bad. The episode aired on February 15, 2016 on AMC in the United States. Outside of the United States, the episode premiered on streaming service Netflix in several countries.

== Plot ==
=== Opening ===
In a flash-forward, "Gene Takavic" manages a Cinnabon store in a mall in Omaha, Nebraska. When closing for the night, he accidentally locks himself in the mall's dumpster room. He contemplates using an emergency exit, but desists because the alarm on the door would notify the police. A janitor opens the door nearly two and a half hours later, and Gene leaves after having carved "SG WAS HERE" into the wall with a screw while he waited.

=== Main story ===
Jimmy McGill declines Davis & Main's employment offer (Note: As seen in "Marco".) and goes on vacation at a luxury hotel under an assumed name. Kim Wexler confronts him but Jimmy is content since his reason for becoming a lawyer was to impress Chuck McGill, who is not supportive. Jimmy convinces Kim to help him con Ken, an obnoxious businessman, into paying their expensive tab at a tequila bar. Thrilled by the experience, Kim keeps the elaborate bottle stopper as a souvenir and spends the night with Jimmy, but says she does not want to participate in this behavior all the time. Jimmy decides to take the job with Davis & Main and finds that benefits include an expensive company car as well as the cocobolo desk he always wanted. Jimmy notices a wall switch in his new office which has a note posted on it indicating that it should never be turned off. He turns it off and waits a moment to see what happens. When nothing does, he turns it back on.

Mike Ehrmantraut refuses another job with "Pryce", who has spent some of his money (Note: As seen in "Pimento".) on a flashy and expensive new Hummer that Mike believes will draw too much attention. Pryce fires Mike because he believes he no longer needs a bodyguard, ignoring Mike's warnings that it is not wise to deal with Nacho alone. Nacho takes advantage of Mike's absence to obtain Pryce's address and real name (Daniel Wormald) from the vehicle registration papers in the glove compartment.

Daniel's house is ransacked and he calls the police, upset that his valuable baseball card collection has been stolen. The responding officers are suspicious about the nature of the burglary because valuable items including Daniel's computer and TV were left untouched; they are also suspicious of his Hummer. When they search inside his house, the officers find a hidden wall compartment behind his couch, apparently located and emptied by the burglar.

== Production ==
This episode was written and directed by executive producer Thomas Schnauz, who also wrote the episodes "Nacho" and "Pimento" of the previous season. Just like "Switch", "Pimento" was also directed by Schnauz. Despite being credited, Michael McKean as Chuck McGill does not appear. Kyle Bornheimer, who plays Ken, reprises his guest role from the first-season Breaking Bad episode "Cancer Man".

== Reception ==
=== Ratings ===
Upon airing, the episode received 2.57 million American viewers, and an 18-49 rating of 1.1.

Including Live+3 viewership, the premiere was watched by 4.708 million viewers and attained an 18-49 rating of 2.1.

=== Critical reception ===
The episode received positive reviews from critics. On Rotten Tomatoes, the episode has a 93% rating with an average score of 8.4 out of 10 based on 14 reviews. The site's critical consensus reads, "'Switch' succeeds in taking its sweet time while laying nuanced groundwork for the anticipated transition from Jimmy into Saul."

Terri Schwartz of IGN gave the episode an 8.5 rating, concluding, "'Switch' marks a solid return for Better Call Saul as we begin to see the 'how' of Jimmy's transition into Saul Goodman be explored." The Telegraph note how "it was obviously a hoot to resume acquaintances with Jimmy, Kim and Mike". The A.V. Club gave the episode a B+.
