= Inflatable (Better Call Saul) =

- Better Call Saul episode
- Episode no.: Season 2 Episode 7
- Directed by: Colin Bucksey; Thomas Schnauz (uncredited)
- Written by: Gordon Smith; Thomas Schnauz (uncredited)
- Original air date: March 28, 2016
- Running time: 42 minutes

Guest appearances
- Ed Begley, Jr. as Clifford Main; Kerry Condon as Stacey Ehrmantraut; Dennis Boutsikaris as Rich Schweikart; Jessie Ennis as Erin Brill; Josh Fadem as Joey Dixon; Omar Maskati as Omar; Raphael Sbarge as Charles McGill, Sr.; Stephen Snedden as The Grifter; Eileen Fogarty as Mrs. Nguyen; Jennifer Hasty as Stephanie Doswell; Blake Bertrand as a young Jimmy McGill; Julie Pearl as ADA Suzanne Ericsen; Kurt Caceres as an Assistant District Attorney; Julian Bonfiglio as The Sound Guy; Esodie Geiger as Lynne Pierson; Suzanne Savoy as Perry Trivedi; David Grant Wright as Doug Lynton

Episode chronology
← Previous "Bali Ha'i"	Next → "Fifi"
- Better Call Saul season 2

"Inflatable" is the seventh episode of the second season of the American television crime drama series Better Call Saul, a spin-off series of Breaking Bad. Written by Gordon Smith and directed by Colin Bucksey, the episode aired on AMC in the United States on March 28, 2016. Outside of the United States, the episode premiered on the streaming service Netflix in several countries.

== Plot ==
=== Opening ===
In a flashback to 1973, Jimmy McGill is working in his father's store when a grifter enters and attempts to pull a con by telling Jimmy's father he has a young child and is in financial need. Jimmy disbelieves the grifter and tries to warn his father, but his father is more concerned that suspicion could cause him to turn away someone who really requires help. While Jimmy's father is distracted, the grifter admits the con and tells Jimmy there are only wolves and sheep in the world, and he will have to choose which to be. Disillusioned by his father's gullibility, Jimmy steals money from the register.

=== Main story ===
Jimmy represents Mike Ehrmantraut when Mike tells the prosecutor that the gun found during his fight with Tuco Salamanca was not Tuco's. Jimmy decides to quit D&M, but learns this will require repaying the signing bonus he received upon joining. Jimmy finds a loophole in his employment agreement that allows him to keep the money if he is fired without cause. While waiting at a stop light, he sees an inflatable tube man outside an oil-changing shop. Inspired by the colorful display, he executes a plan to get fired by being irritating at work, from dressing in flashy suits to playing the bagpipes in his office to not flushing the toilet after trips to the bathroom. Clifford Main finally fires Jimmy and tells him losing the signing bonus is worth it just to be rid of him. Jimmy then moves back to his old office at the nail salon.

Jimmy approaches Kim Wexler and attempts to convince her to partner with him in their own law firm. Kim agrees, but only on the condition that Jimmy plays it "straight and narrow". Jimmy admits that he can only be himself, which means pushing the envelope on what is legal and ethical, so Kim politely refuses.

Mike promises to buy Stacey Ehrmantraut a new house in a better neighborhood and begins scouting Hector Salamanca's restaurant. After interviewing with Schweikart & Cokely, Kim tells Jimmy that she will not take the job but will instead set up her own solo practice. Kim proposes a compromise to Jimmy, suggesting they start separate solo firms, but share office space to save on expenses and support each other if needed. Jimmy considers her offer and does not immediately respond.

== Production ==
The opening flashback with the grifter and a young Jimmy was originally filmed two years earlier for the season 1 episode "Pimento," both written and directed by fellow writer Thomas Schnauz. However, it was dropped due to time constraints, and Schnauz remained uncredited. The writing staff hoped to use the scene in a future episode, resulting in them not choosing to release it as a bonus feature during the first season Blu-ray release. They eventually found "Inflatable" as a good fit for the scene. The grifter in the flashback is portrayed by Stephen Snedden, who was previously a starring cast member of The Lone Gunmen, a spin-off of The X-Files that Better Call Saul co-creator Vince Gilligan wrote and developed. Snedden also appeared in The X-Files episode "Jump the Shark", also co-written by Gilligan, to resolve some of the hanging plotlines of The Lone Gunmen after the series was cancelled.

The montage of Jimmy assembling his gaudy wardrobe is set to the instrumental "Scorpio" by Dennis Coffey and the Detroit Guitar Band, described by IndieWire as "the perfect texture to match the rainbow-colored, split-screen extravaganza it's soundtracking".

== Reception ==
=== Ratings ===
Upon airing, the episode received 2.03 million American viewers, and an 18–49 rating of 0.8.

=== Critical reception ===
The episode received very positive reviews from critics. It holds a perfect 100% positive rating with an average score of 8.88 out of 10 on the review aggregator site Rotten Tomatoes. The critics' consensus reads: "Rich in character (and colorful suits), "Inflatable" is a funny and profound turning point for several key figures with life-altering decisions to be made."

Terri Schwartz of IGN gave the episode a 9.3 rating, writing: "Jimmy decides to set out on his own solo path – but Kim isn't willing to fully walk it with them."
