= Nick Forshager =

American sound editor

- Born: Kurt Nicholas Forshager
- Occupation: Sound editor

Kurt Nicholas Forshager is an American sound editor. He won a Primetime Emmy Award and was nominated for eleven more in the category Outstanding Sound Editing.

Forshager has worked in the sound industry for more than thirty years and has served as president of the sound production company Wildtracks for over two decades. His work includes the television programs Breaking Bad (and its spin-off Better Call Saul), El Camino: A Breaking Bad Movie, and Ozark.
