= Nailed (Better Call Saul) =

- Better Call Saul episode
- Episode no.: Season 2 Episode 9
- Directed by: Peter Gould
- Written by: Peter Gould
- Original air date: April 11, 2016
- Running time: 49 minutes

Guest appearances
- Rex Linn as Kevin Wachtell; Michael Chieffo as Commissioner Ughetta; Josh Fadem as Joey Dixon; Cara Pifko as Paige Novick; Manuel Uriza as Ximenez Lecerda; Elisha Yaffe as Lance; Hayley Holmes as The Drama Girl; John Christian Love as Ernesto; Julian Bonfiglio as The Sound Guy; Vincent Fuentes as Arturo Colon; Debrianna Mansini as Fran; Mark Margolis as Hector Salamanca

Episode chronology
← Previous "Fifi"	Next → "Klick"
- Better Call Saul season 2

"Nailed" is the ninth and penultimate episode of the second season of the AMC television series Better Call Saul, the spinoff series of Breaking Bad. The episode aired on April 11, 2016 on AMC in the United States. Outside of the United States, the episode premiered on streaming service Netflix in several countries.

== Plot ==
A disguised Mike Ehrmantraut uses his spike strip (Note: As seen in "Fifi".) to ambush one of Hector Salamanca's trucks and extracts the $250,000 hidden in a tire while leaving the driver, Ximenez Lecerda, tied up. He explains to Nacho Varga his intent to attract police attention to Hector's drug operation, but Nacho tells him a passing Good Samaritan freed Ximenez. Ximenez then called Hector, who dispatched a crew to clean up traces of the attack, including killing and burying the Good Samaritan.

Jimmy McGill and his camera crew shoot video of Jimmy standing in front of the American flag at an elementary school for use in his TV ads. When the principal interrupts them, Jimmy claims he is filming a documentary on Rupert Holmes, who is supposedly an alumnus. The skeptical principal leaves to call the superintendent, enabling Jimmy and his crew to finish.

At a meeting of the New Mexico Banking Board, members realize the application Chuck McGill submitted for a new Mesa Verde branch is incorrect, resulting in a six-week delay. Kevin Wachtell leaves HHM and retains Kim Wexler, who promises Mesa Verde will be her sole client. Chuck accuses Jimmy of sabotage when Jimmy and Kim pick up the Mesa Verde files from Chuck's house. Kim claims Chuck simply made a mistake, but alone in the car with Jimmy, Kim reveals her awareness of his trick by angrily punching him.

That night, Kim tells Jimmy she never wants to discuss how the incorrect documents came to be filed but says that if Jimmy left any evidence, Chuck will find it. Jimmy realizes he can be caught if the clerk at the store where he altered the documents says he was there, so he goes to buy the clerk's silence. He arrives while Ernesto is questioning the clerk, who then leaves to get Chuck. Jimmy enters the store, bribes the clerk, then hides across the street. Ernesto and Chuck arrive and Chuck questions the clerk, but his electromagnetic hypersensitivity symptoms cause him to faint and hit his head. Jimmy is torn between his desire to aid Chuck and his reluctance to come out of hiding because doing so would be an admission that he had been there previously.

== Reception ==
=== Ratings ===
Upon airing, the episode received 2.06 million American viewers, and an 18–49 rating of 0.8.

=== Critical reception ===
The episode received critical acclaim from critics. It holds a perfect 100% positive rating with an average score of 9.58 out of 10 on the review aggregator site Rotten Tomatoes. The critics' consensus reads: ""Nailed" is a standout episode that brings the action to a heartbreaking head leading into the season finale."

Terri Schwartz of IGN gave the episode a 9.5 rating, writing "What is going to happen with Chuck?!"

For their work on this episode, Kelley Dixon and Chris McCaleb were nominated Outstanding Single-Camera Picture Editing for a Drama Series at the 68th Primetime Creative Arts Emmy Awards.
