= Fifi (Better Call Saul) =

- Better Call Saul episode
- Episode no.: Season 2 Episode 8
- Directed by: Larysa Kondracki
- Written by: Thomas Schnauz
- Editing by: Skip Macdonald
- Original air date: April 4, 2016
- Running time: 48 minutes

Guest appearances
- Kerry Condon as Stacey Ehrmantraut; Rex Linn as Kevin Wachtell; Josh Fadem as Joey Dixon; Cara Pifko as Paige Novick; Brendan Fehr as Captain Bauer; Manuel Uriza as Ximenez Lecerda; Elisha Yaffe as Lance; John Christian Love as Ernesto; Vincent Fuentes as Arturo Colon; Abigail Zoe Lewis as Kaylee Ehrmantraut; Julian Bonfiglio as The Sound Guy; Robert Grossman as Theodore "Fudge" Talbott; Mark Margolis as Hector Salamanca

Episode chronology
← Previous "Inflatable"	Next → "Nailed"
- Better Call Saul season 2

"Fifi" is the eighth episode of the second season of the AMC television series Better Call Saul, the spinoff series of Breaking Bad. The episode aired on April 4, 2016 on AMC in the United States. Outside of the United States, the episode premiered on streaming service Netflix in several countries.

== Plot ==
Jimmy McGill accepts Kim Wexler's offer to set up separate firms in shared office space, and Kim announces to Howard Hamlin her resignation from HHM; Howard accepts and wishes her well. Immediately after exiting the office, Howard and Kim race to secure the Mesa Verde account. Kim meets with Kevin Wachtell and Paige Novick, Mesa Verde's president and chief legal counsel, and they agree to become a client of her solo practice. Kim and Jimmy set up their practices in a re-purposed dentists' office. Howard reports Kim's resignation and the loss of Mesa Verde to Chuck McGill. Chuck braves his supposed electromagnetic hypersensitivity symptoms to meet with Kevin and Paige at HHM and damns Kim with faint praise, which causes Kevin to back out of his agreement with Kim and continue with HHM. Chuck is unable to continue suppressing his EHS and collapses as soon as the meeting is over.

Jimmy pretends Fudge, an elderly registered sex offender, is a World War II veteran so his camera crew and he can gain access to a U.S. Air Force base. Once inside, they use FIFI, a World War II-era Boeing B-29 Superfortress, as the backdrop for a TV ad to attract new clients to Jimmy's elder law practice. Upset at losing Mesa Verde, Kim has doubts about her future with Jimmy, but he reassures her there will be other opportunities to win over big clients.

Ernesto tells Jimmy that Chuck's condition has worsened because of his time at HHM's offices. Jimmy goes to Chuck's home and volunteers to take over Chuck's care. After Chuck falls asleep, Jimmy accesses the Mesa Verde files, then visits an all-night copy store to falsify information in the application documents for a soon-to-open branch.

Mike Ehrmantraut continues to watch Hector Salamanca's restaurant and tracks his movements to a remote garage. After returning home, he uses a garden hose, nails, and power drill to begin assembling a homemade spike strip.

== Opening shot ==
The opening shot of this episode is notable for being a 4-minute and 22-second seamless "one shot". The shot was inspired by the famous opening shot of Orson Welles's Touch of Evil, and used techniques including 3D digital elements and animation, matte paintings, and extensive rotoscope. The episode was nominated for a Primetime Emmy for "Outstanding Special Visual Effects in a Supporting Role" for the work done.

== Reception ==
=== Ratings ===
Upon airing, the episode received 1.93 million American viewers, and an 18-49 rating of 0.8.

=== Critical reception ===
The episode received very positive reviews from critics. It holds a perfect 100% positive rating with an average score of 8.2 out of 10 on the review aggregator site Rotten Tomatoes. The critics' consensus reads: "Emotionally foreboding and beautifully shot, "Fifi" draws empathy for several key characters, even those normally disliked."

Terri Schwartz of IGN gave the episode an 8.7 rating, writing "A sabotage of a sabotage as Jimmy and Kim try to set up a new law practice."

This episode was nominated at the 68th Primetime Creative Arts Emmy Awards for Outstanding Special Visual Effects in a Supporting Role.
