= Pimento (Better Call Saul) =

- Better Call Saul episode
- Episode no.: Season 1 Episode 9
- Directed by: Thomas Schnauz
- Written by: Thomas Schnauz
- Editing by: Skip Macdonald
- Original air date: March 30, 2015
- Running time: 47 minutes

Guest appearances
- Kerry Condon as Stacey Ehrmantraut; Dennis Boutsikaris as Rich Schweikart; Mark Proksch as Daniel "Pryce" Wormald; Steven Ogg as Sobchak; David Mattey as Clarence / Man Mountain; Faith Healey as Kaylee Ehrmantraut

Episode chronology
← Previous "RICO"	Next → "Marco"
- Better Call Saul season 1

"Pimento" is the ninth and penultimate episode of the first season of the AMC television series Better Call Saul, the spin-off series of Breaking Bad. The episode aired on March 30, 2015 on AMC in the United States. Outside of the United States, the episode premiered on streaming service Netflix in several countries.

== Plot ==
Chuck warns Jimmy that Sandpiper's attorneys will attempt to obtain a restraining order barring Jimmy from their property, which Jimmy prevents from being approved. Upon returning to Chuck's house, he finds that Sandpiper's attorneys have resorted to a document dump. Chuck suggests referring the case to HHM; Jimmy is reluctant but arranges a meeting. While Jimmy is asleep, Chuck uses Jimmy's phone to make a call.

Because of Chuck's EHS, Howard prepares for Chuck and Jimmy's arrival at HHM by confiscating cell phones and shutting down electricity. Howard offers Jimmy twenty percent of the final settlement or judgment and a $20,000 of-counsel fee, but makes it clear Jimmy will not continue on the case. Jimmy angrily demands to know why he is always excluded from the firm. When Howard does not answer, Jimmy keeps the case. Kim confronts Howard, who resists telling her the reason for his actions, then confides the truth.

Mike receives a job offer to bodyguard Daniel Wormald, who intends to sell pills stolen from his employer. Another bodyguard, Sobchak, mocks Mike for carrying no weapons, only a pimento cheese sandwich for lunch. He dares Mike to disarm him, which Mike easily does, prompting the third bodyguard, Man Mountain to flee. Mike coaches Daniel on how to act during the drug deal, which is with Nacho Varga. After Nacho hands over the cash, Daniel notes the payment is twenty dollars short, and Mike calmly insists that Nacho pay in full. As they leave, Mike tells Daniel he had researched Nacho and knew the deal would be carried out without his bosses' knowledge, so Nacho would not risk a confrontation.

That night, Kim suggests Jimmy take Howard's offer, which will enable him to start his own firm. After rejecting Kim's advice, Jimmy realizes Chuck used his phone the night before. The next day, Jimmy informs Chuck that he will accept Howard's deal, having deduced that Chuck was using Howard to keep Jimmy out of HHM ever since he first passed the bar.

Jimmy demands to know why Chuck has treated him so badly, and Chuck spitefully confesses he does not consider Jimmy a real lawyer. He says he was proud when Jimmy stopped running cons and worked in the HHM mailroom, but Jimmy should not be an attorney because he has not changed his dishonest ways. Feeling betrayed, Jimmy cuts his ties with Chuck.

== Production ==
This episode was written and directed by Thomas Schnauz, who also wrote "Nacho" earlier in the season.

Steven Ogg's character is named Sobchak in the script for the show, but never referred to by name, and later only named as the alias "Mr. X" in the fifth-season episode "Dedicado a Max". The name was selected by Schnauz in reference to John Goodman's character Walter Sobchak in The Big Lebowski.

A flashback scene was filmed for this episode featuring a young Jimmy McGill witnessing his father getting scammed by a grifter, but was dropped for time constraints. The staff chose not to release the scene as a bonus feature for the first season home video release in hopes of using it further down the line, and it was eventually used for the second season episode "Inflatable".

== Reception ==
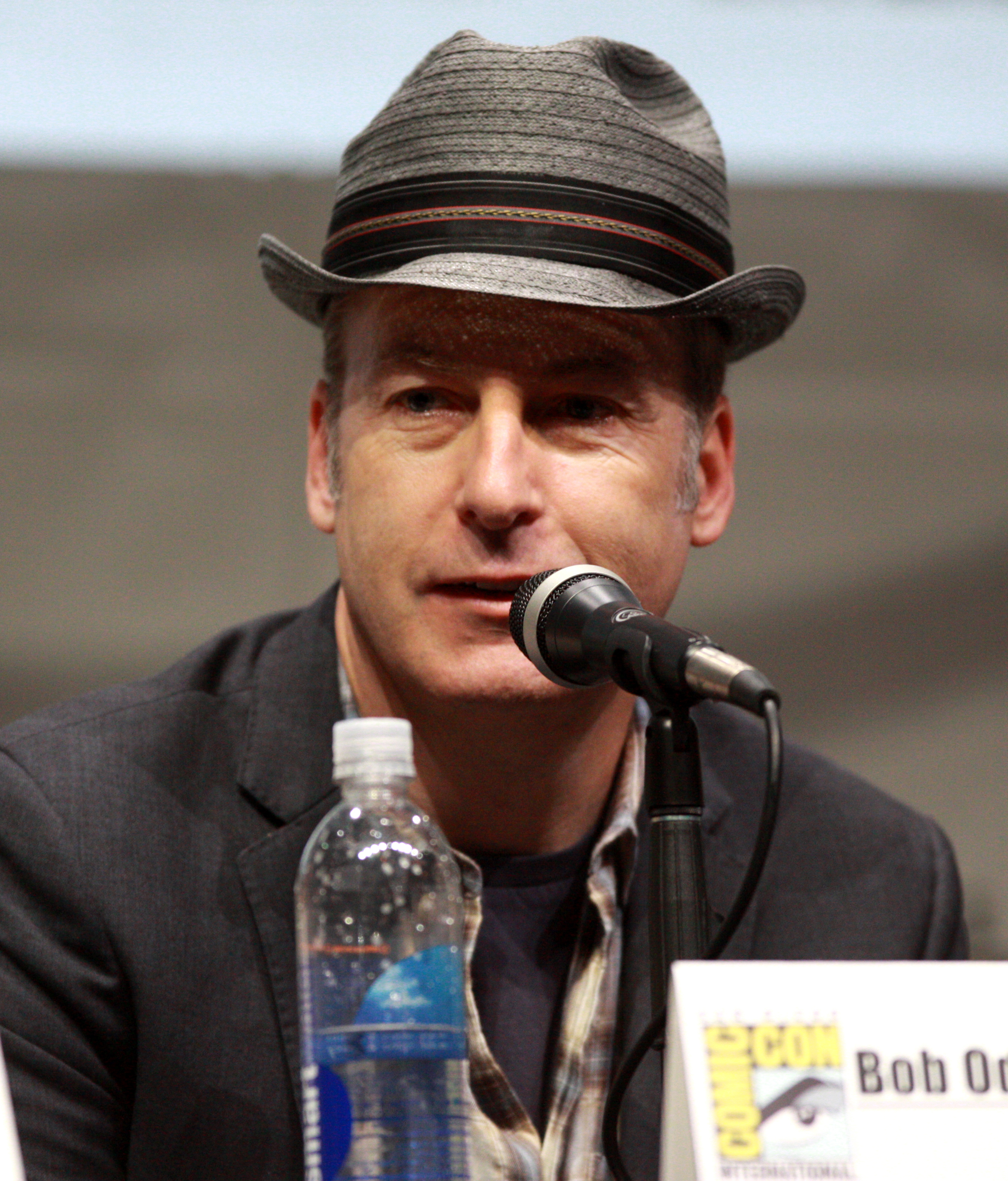
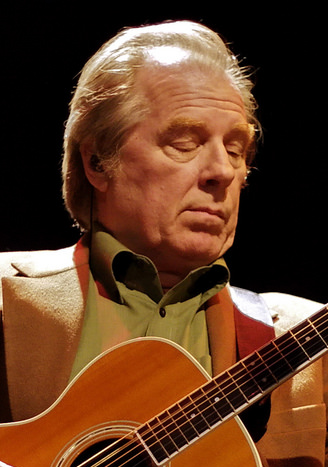
Bob Odenkirk (left) and Michael McKean (right) both received high praise for their performances in the episode

Upon airing, the episode received 2.38 million American viewers, and an 18–49 rating of 1.1.

The episode received critical acclaim, with many critics praising the plot twist at the end and the performances from Bob Odenkirk and Michael McKean. On Rotten Tomatoes, based on 20 reviews, it received a 100% approval rating with an average score of 8.8 out of 10. The site's consensus reads, "A terrifically-acted, heart-wrenching revelation, mixed with a tough and powerful subplot for Mike, makes "Pimento" a superior penultimate episode of a consistently strong season." Roth Cornet of IGN gave the episode a 9.0 rating, concluding, "Better Call Saul revealed the betrayal that may very well be at the heart of what turns Jimmy McGill into Saul Goodman, as this stunningly crafted story continues to unfold." The Telegraph rated the episode 4 out of 5 stars. Odenkirk submitted this episode when nominated for the Emmy for Best Actor.
