= Marion Dayre =

American television writer and producer

- Born: Heather Williams; Superior, Nebraska
- Other name: Heather Marion
- Education: Concordia University Nebraska; UCLA
- Occupations: Screenwriter; television producer
- Years active: 2008–present
- Notable work: Better Call Saul; Echo

Marion Dayre (born Heather Williams), also known as Heather Marion, is an American television writer and producer. She is best known for writing AMC's Better Call Saul (2015–2022), as the creator and showrunner of the 2024 Disney+/Marvel miniseries Echo and as the co-creator and co-showrunner of Amazon's upcoming Wytches. She has been nominated for four Emmy Awards, six Writers Guild of America Awards and awarded a Peabody Award.

== Early life ==
Dayre grew up in rural Superior, Nebraska. In an interview with Forbes, Dayre shared, "I grew up in a funeral home in a 2,000-person town. My Dad, Uncle, and Grandpa are all funeral directors. In a small family business that means they do every job: from mowing to painting to sprinklers to driving the monument truck in the cemetery to handling floral arrangements to staffing funerals to the realer, more emotional stuff – moving with thousands of families through transformative experiences like grief and death and celebration of life. As early as grade school I started writing stories about birth and death and religion and spirituality and anatomy and miracles. I didn’t have words for it, but writing was one of my purest connections with higher power. Doing it for a living was the farthest thing from my mind."

As a teenager, she enjoyed creative writing and attended screenwriting workshops at the home of Lew Hunter. She attended Concordia University Nebraska and originally studied biochemistry, aspiring to be a mortician and join the family business or a pediatrician. During an exchange with Concordia College, she studied sketch comedy in New York City. She graduated in 2005 with a BFA in English. Her first writing job was as a railroad journalist.

Her pen name is rooted in paternal family names.

== Career ==
In 2008, Dayre moved to Los Angeles to pursue screenwriting. She worked as an assistant to United States of Tara showrunner Joey Soloway and then as an assistant to actor Jeff Garlin, including on the sets Curb Your Enthusiasm and The Goldbergs. With Garlin, she associate produced his 2013 film Dealin' with Idiots. Dayre also performed in sketch shows at Straitjacket Society and the Upright Citizens Brigade.

Dayre received her MFA in screenwriting from UCLA in 2013. With her original pilot script, Bury Me, based on her childhood in a funeral home, she took part in the 2014 Sundance Institute Writers Lab.

Dayre's big break was the AMC series Better Call Saul, which she joined in its inaugural season as a writers' assistant and rose in rank to executive story editor and writer. For the first two seasons (2015–2016), she worked as a writer's assistant and then script coordinator. She wrote her first episode with Vince Gilligan, the second season finale "Klick". Dayre would go on to write the episodes "Slip" (S3, E8), "Talk" (S4, E4), and "Dedicado a Max" (S5, E5). Dayre also functioned as the fourth season's story editor (2018) and as executive story editor for the fifth season (2020).

In 2021, it was announced Dayre would be head writer of the Disney+ Marvel Cinematic Universe (MCU) miniseries, Echo. It is based on the Marvel Comics character of the same name and a spin-off from the 2021 series Hawkeye. The show was released in early 2024.

In February 2023, it was announced that Amazon would produce an animated television adaptation of the comic book Wytches, with co-showrunners Scott Snyder and Dayre.

As of February 2026, Dayre opened a writers room for an additional Untitled series for Amazon Prime Video.

Dayre also teaches television series development at The University of Georgia and San Francisco State University.

== Filmography ==
=== Films ===
Year	Title	Role	Notes
2013	Dealin' with Idiots	Associate Producer	

=== Television ===
==== Episode credits (as writer) ====
Year	Show	Season	Episode number	Episode title	Notes
2016	Better Call Saul	2	10	"Klick"	Co-written with Vince Gilligan
2017	Better Call Saul	3	8	"Slip"	
2018	Better Call Saul	4	4	"Talk"	
2019	The Act	1	6	"A Whole New World"	
2020	Better Call Saul	5	5	"Dedicado a Max"	
2022	Shantaram	1	6	"Dead Man Walking"	
2024	Echo	1	1	"Chafa"	
2024	Echo	1	2	"Lowak"	
2024	Echo	1	3	"Tuklo"	

==== Production staff ====
Year	Show	Role	Notes
2015	Better Call Saul	Writers' assistant	Season 1
2016	Better Call Saul	Writer's assistant, script coordinator	Season 2
2017	Better Call Saul	Staff writer	Season 3
2018	Better Call Saul	Story editor, staff writer	Season 4
2020	Better Call Saul	Executive story editor, staff writer	Season 5
2022	Shantaram	Producer	
2024	Echo	Head writer, executive producer	
TBA	Wytches	Co-showrunner	

== Awards ==
Year	Ceremony	Category	Nominated work	Results	Notes	Ref
2016	Writers Guild of America Awards	Drama Series	Better Call Saul	Nominated	With writers	
2016	Writers Guild of America Awards	Episodic Drama	Better Call Saul	Nominated	For episode "Klick" (with Vince Gilligan)	
2017	Writers Guild of America Awards	Drama Series	Better Call Saul	Nominated	With writers	
2017	Writers Guild of America Awards	Episodic Drama	Better Call Saul	Nominated	For episode "Slip"	
2018	Writers Guild of America Awards	Drama Series	Better Call Saul	Nominated	With writers	
2018	Peabody Awards	Entertainment honorees	Better Call Saul	Won	With writers	
2020	Writers Guild of America Awards	Drama Series	Better Call Saul	Nominated	With writers	
