= Better Call Saul season 2 =

Second season of the AMC crime drama television series

Better Call Saul
- Season 2
- Home media cover art
- Showrunners: Vince Gilligan; Peter Gould
- Starring: Bob Odenkirk; Jonathan Banks; Rhea Seehorn; Patrick Fabian; Michael Mando; Michael McKean
- No. of episodes: 10

Release
- Original network: AMC
- Original release: February 15 – April 18, 2016

Season chronology
- ← Previous; Season 1 Next → Season 3

The second season of the American television series Better Call Saul premiered on February 15, 2016, and concluded on April 18, 2016. The ten-episode season was broadcast on Monday nights in the United States on AMC. A spin-off-prequel of Breaking Bad, Better Call Saul was created by Vince Gilligan and Peter Gould, both of whom also worked on Breaking Bad.

This season, like the previous, mainly takes place in 2002, with Bob Odenkirk reprising his role as Jimmy McGill, a lawyer who has a feud with his brother Chuck (Michael McKean). Soon Kim Wexler (Rhea Seehorn), a Hamlin, Hamlin & McGill (HHM) attorney who is Jimmy's lover and former mailroom co-worker, leaves the practice of law at HHM to start a solo practice in office space she shares with Jimmy. Jonathan Banks reprises his role as Mike Ehrmantraut; he is engaged in a conflict with the Mexican drug cartel after an altercation with Tuco (Raymond Cruz), which was orchestrated by Nacho Varga (Michael Mando). This results in Mike getting targeted by Tuco's uncle Hector (Mark Margolis).

The second season of Better Call Saul received acclaim from critics, with praise for its acting performances and cinematography, and six nominations for the 68th Primetime Emmy Awards, including Outstanding Drama Series.

== Production ==
In June 2014, during the production of the first season, AMC ordered a 13-episode second season of Better Call Saul to be aired in 2016. By November of that year, the second season had been shortened to 10 episodes.

=== Casting ===
Mark Margolis and Daniel and Luis Moncada reprise their roles from Breaking Bad as Hector "Tio" Salamanca and Leonel and Marco Salamanca, playing Tuco's uncle and cousins respectively, who are high-ranking members of the Mexican drug cartel.

All of the main cast returned for this season; Bob Odenkirk as Jimmy McGill, Jonathan Banks as Mike Ehrmantraut, Rhea Seehorn as Kim Wexler, Patrick Fabian as Howard Hamlin, Michael Mando as Nacho Varga, and Michael McKean as Chuck McGill.

=== Filming ===
Production for the second season of Better Call Saul began in June 2015, two months after the first season finished airing. Better Call Saul is set and filmed in Albuquerque, New Mexico, the same location as its predecessor.

In the first scene from the first episode of the season, Jimmy hides his real identity under his Gene Takavic alias while working at a Cinnabon in an Omaha, Nebraska shopping mall. The Cinnabon scenes in Better Call Saul are set in Omaha but filmed at the Cottonwood Mall in Albuquerque, New Mexico.

== Cast and characters ==
=== Main ===
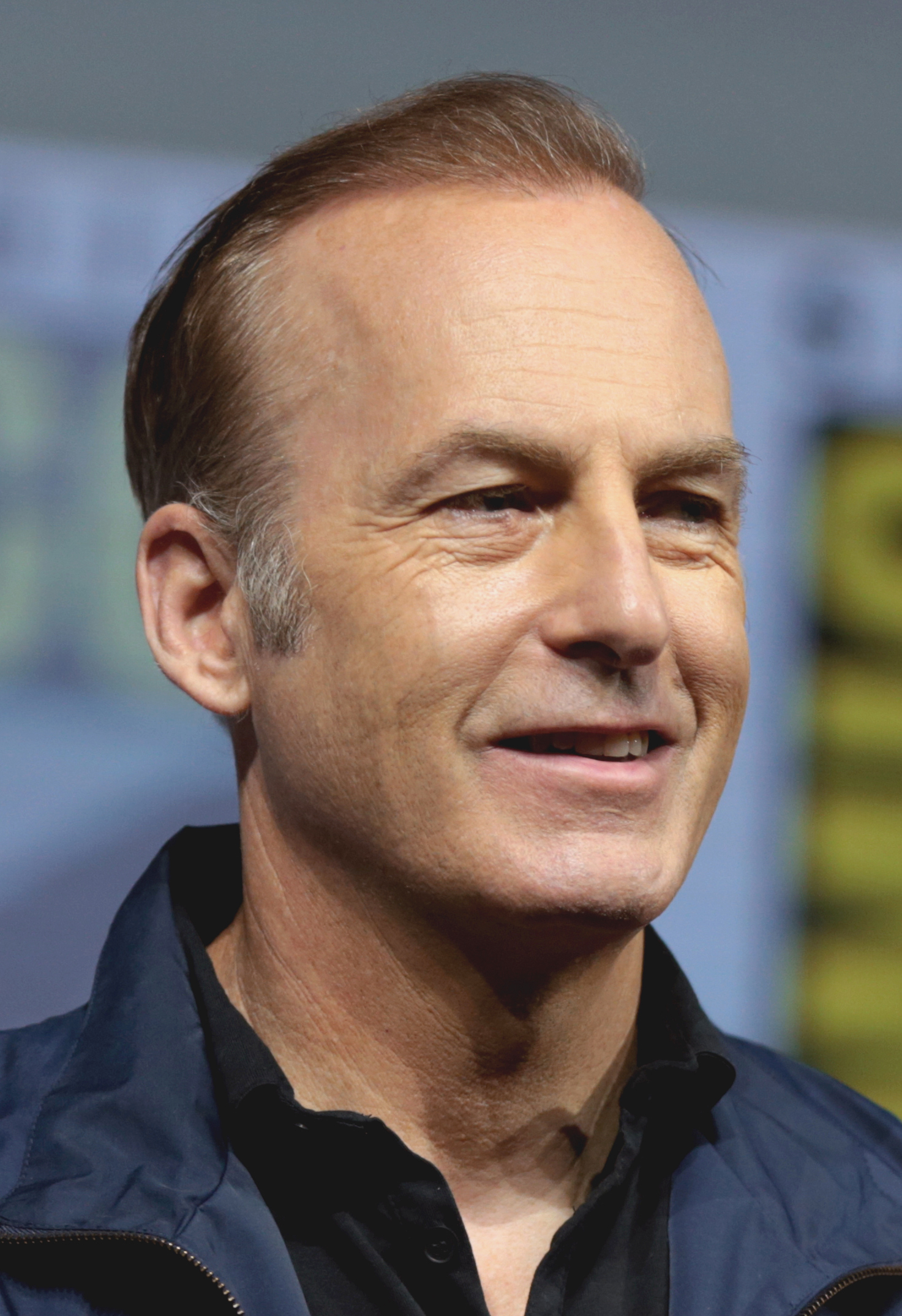
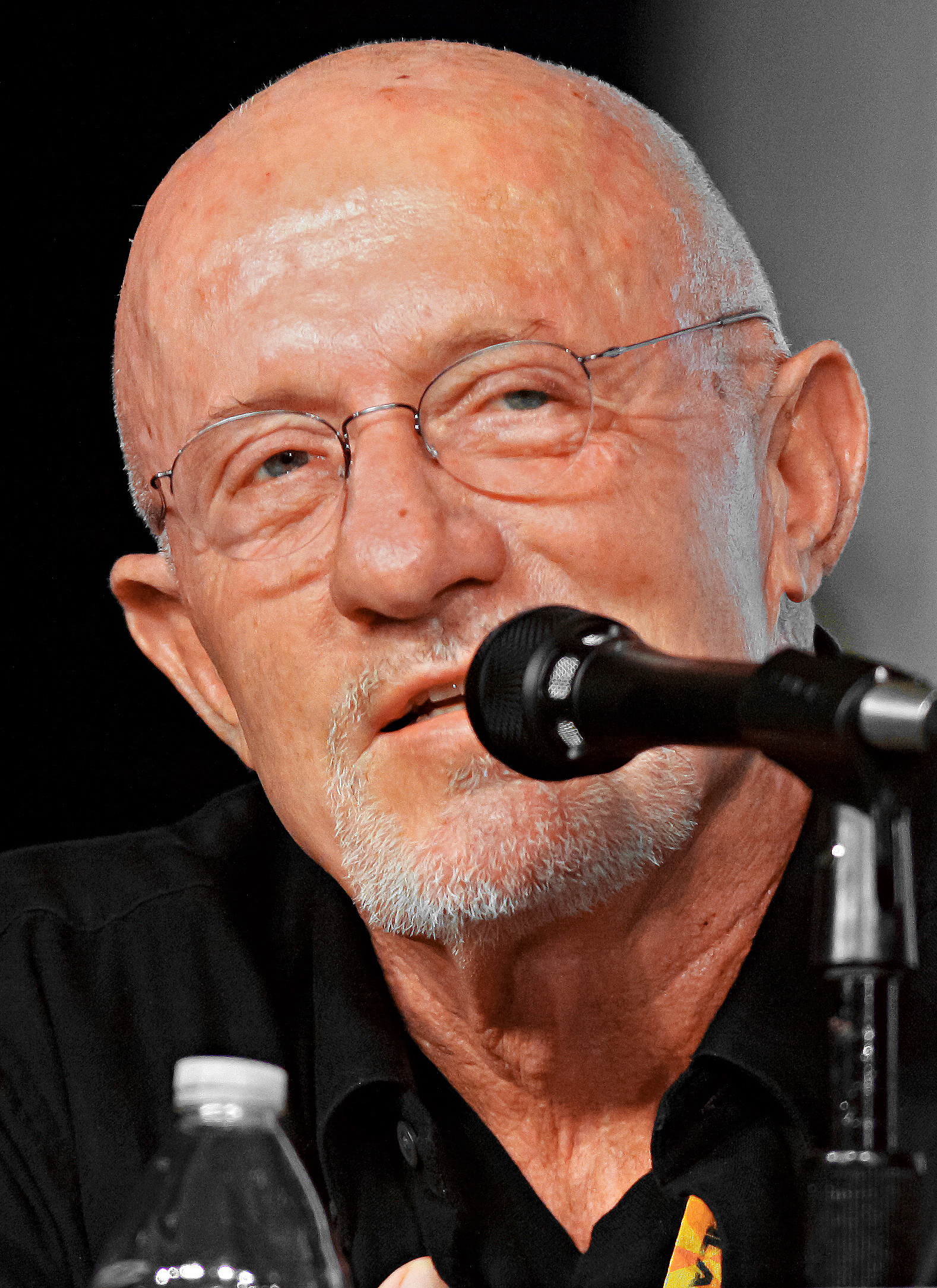
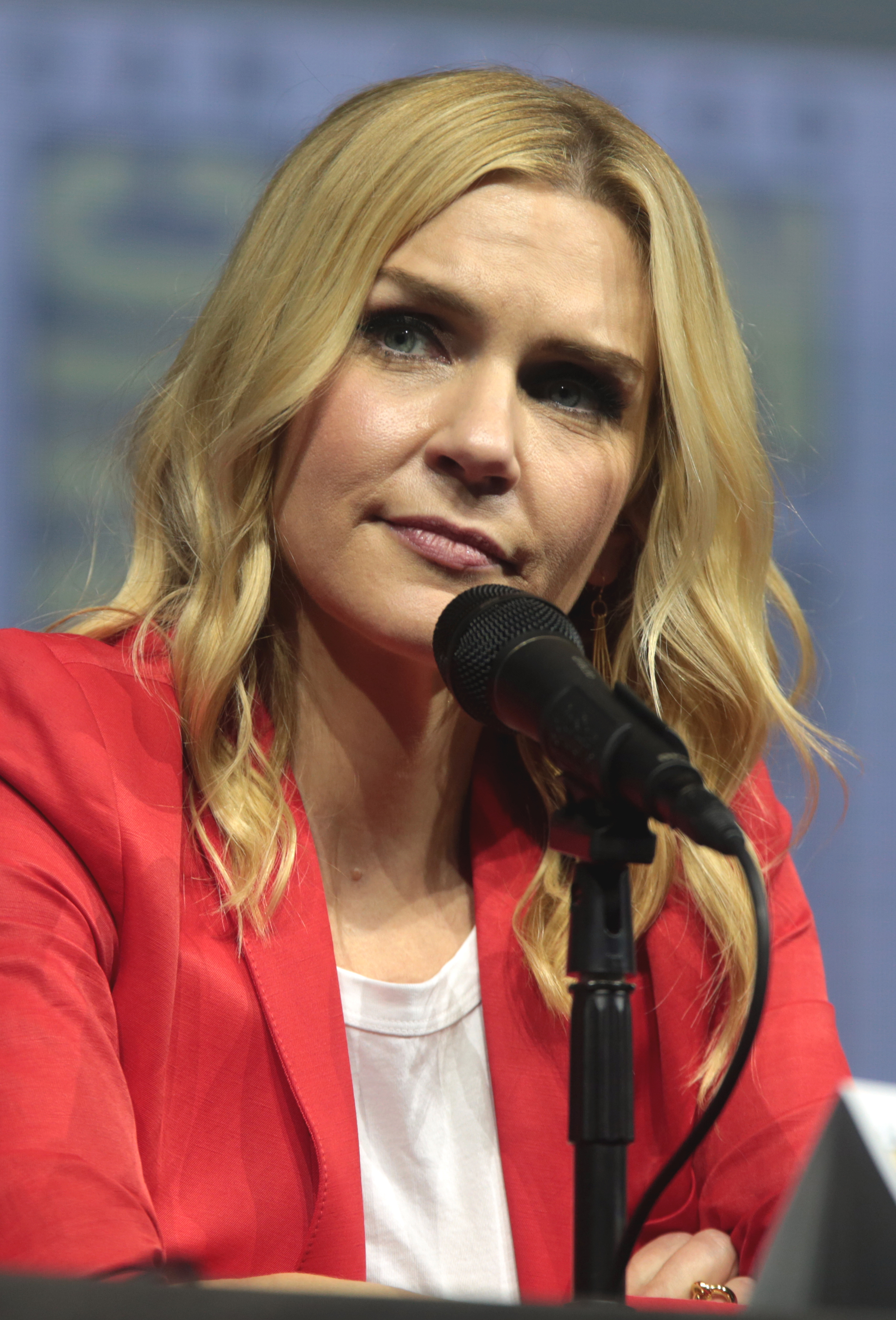
Bob Odenkirk (Jimmy McGill), Jonathan Banks (Mike Ehrmantraut), and Rhea Seehorn (Kim Wexler)
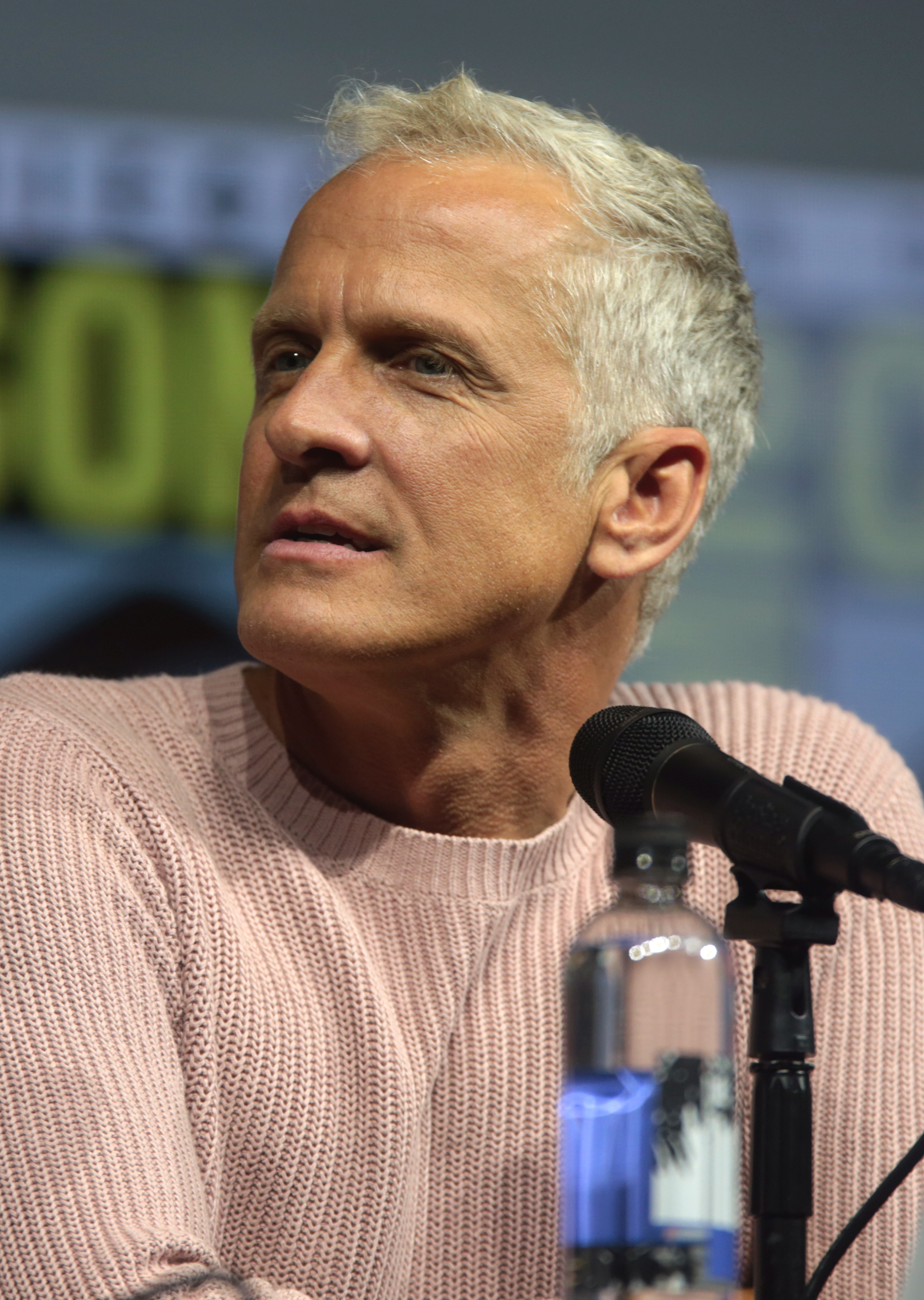
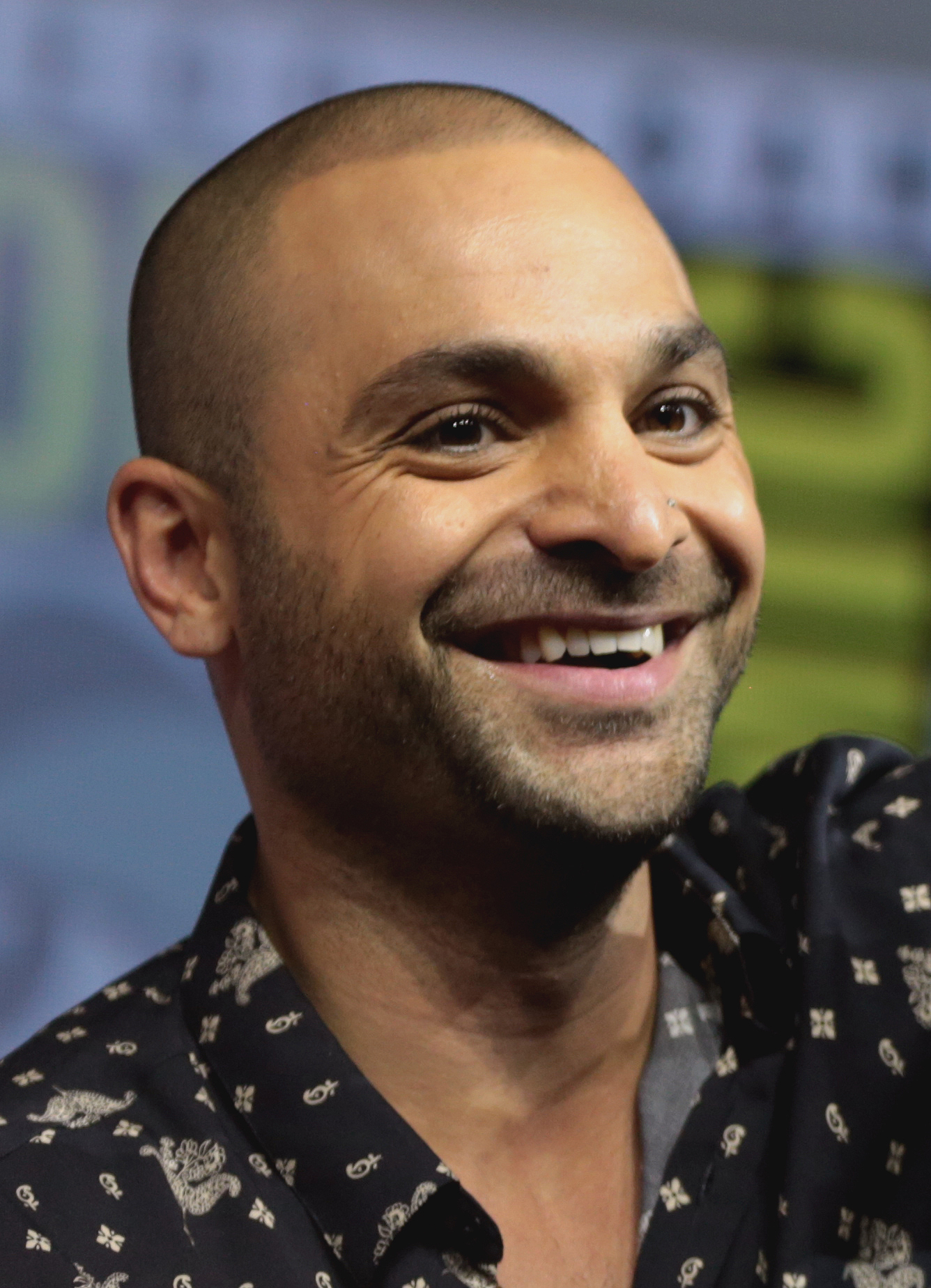
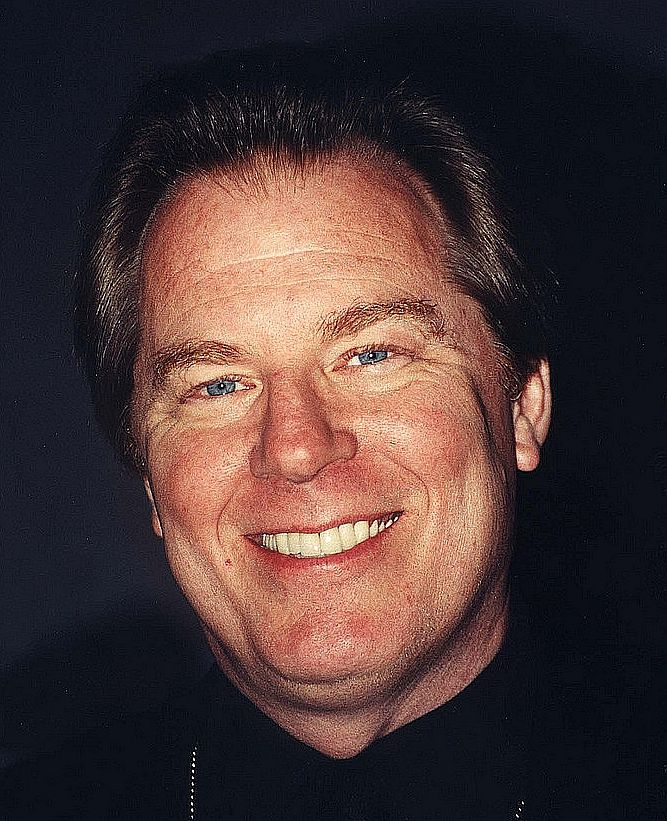
Patrick Fabian (Howard Hamlin), Michael Mando (Nacho Varga), and Michael McKean (Chuck McGill)
- Bob Odenkirk as Jimmy McGill, a lawyer who is morally feuding with his more successful, hypochondriac brother Chuck. In the present, he manages a Cinnabon store in Omaha under the alias Gene Takavic.
- Jonathan Banks as Mike Ehrmantraut, a private investigator and cleaner working in the New Mexico narcotics underworld.
- Rhea Seehorn as Kim Wexler, Jimmy's close friend, lover and legal partner.
- Patrick Fabian as Howard Hamlin, Chuck's law partner at Hamlin, Hamlin & McGill (HHM), an antagonizing figure for Jimmy.
- Michael Mando as Nacho Varga, a clever, ambitious associate of the Salamanca branch of a Mexican drug cartel.
- Michael McKean as Chuck McGill, Jimmy's elder brother, partner at HHM along with Howard, he allegedly suffers from electromagnetic hypersensitivity.

=== Recurring ===
- Ed Begley Jr. as Clifford Main, managing partner at Davis & Main.
- Mark Margolis as Hector Salamanca, Tuco's uncle and Don in a Mexican drug cartel branch that distributes in Albuquerque.
- Kerry Condon as Stacey Ehrmantraut, Mike's widowed daughter-in-law and the mother of Kaylee Ehrmantraut.
- Mark Proksch as Daniel "Pryce" Wormald, a pharmaceutical employee selling pills to Nacho. He also hires Mike as security.
- Omar Maskati as Omar, Jimmy's assistant at Davis & Main.
- Jessie Ennis as Erin Brill, a lawyer at Davis & Main who is ordered to shadow Jimmy.
- Brandon K. Hampton as Ernesto, Chuck's paralegal/assistant at HHM.
- Vincent Fuentes as Arturo, a criminal working for Hector Salamanca.
- Rex Linn as Kevin Wachtell, the CEO of Mesa Verde Bank and Trust.
- Cara Pifko as Paige Novick, senior counsel for Mesa Verde.
- Manuel Uriza as Ximenez Lecerda, a truck driver for Hector Salamanca.
- Eileen Fogarty as Mrs. Nguyen, owner of a nail salon and Jimmy's landlord.
- Josh Fadem as Camera Guy, a UNM film student working for Jimmy.

=== Guest stars ===
- Raymond Cruz as Tuco Salamanca, a ruthless, psychotic Mexican cartel lieutenant in the South Valley.
- Jim Beaver as Lawson, an arms dealer.
- Kyle Bornheimer as Ken ("Ken Wins"), an ill-mannered, arrogant stockbroker, previously appeared in the Breaking Bad episode "Cancer Man".
- Daniel Moncada and Luis Moncada as Leonel and Marco Salamanca, Tuco's viciously violent cousins and Hector's nephews.
- Maximino Arciniega as Domingo "Krazy-8" Molina, reprising his role from Breaking Bad.
- Ann Cusack as Rebecca Bois, Chuck's ex-wife.
- Clea DuVall as Dr. Cruz, Chuck's physician, who suspects his condition is psychosomatic.
- Brendan Fehr as Bauer, a military captain.
- Joe DeRosa as Dr. Caldera, a veterinarian who serves as Mike Ehrmantraut's liaison to the criminal underworld.
- Stoney Westmoreland as Officer Saxton, who previously appeared in the Breaking Bad episode "I.F.T."
- Debrianna Mansini as Fran, a waitress, who previously appeared in the Breaking Bad episode "Madrigal".
- Jennifer Hasty as Stephanie Doswell, a real estate agent, who previously appeared in the Breaking Bad episode "Open House".
- Juan Carlos Cantu as Manuel Varga, Nacho's father who is the owner and manager of an upholstery shop.
- Hayley Holmes as Drama Girl, a UNM film student.
- Julian Bonfiglio as Sound Guy, a UNM film student.

== Episodes ==
Taking the first letter of each episode title and rearranging them yields "FRINGSBACK" ("Fring's back"), foreshadowing the reappearance of Breaking Bad character Gus Fring.

Better Call Saul season 2 episodes
No. overall	No. in season	Title	Directed by	Written by	Original release date	U.S. viewers (millions)
11	1	"Switch"	Thomas Schnauz	Thomas Schnauz	February 15, 2016	2.57
In a flash-forward, "Gene" accidentally locks himself in an Omaha, Nebraska mall's dumpster room, but because of the need to conceal his identity, he is unable to use the emergency exit, which would summon the authorities. When he is finally let out, he leaves behind the words "SG WAS HERE" carved on the wall. In 2002, Jimmy decides to decline Davis & Main's employment offer and closes down his practice. Kim confronts Jimmy about his odd behavior, but Jimmy is adamant about leaving the practice of law. Instead, he persuades Kim to help him con a stock trader into buying them expensive drinks and food and then paying their tab. Thrilled by the experience, Kim spends the night with Jimmy. Daniel ("Pryce") fires Mike since he believes he no longer needs Mike as a bodyguard. Nacho takes advantage of Mike's absence to obtain Pryce's real name and address. Pryce's house is burgled and he calls the police to report his stolen baseball card collection. The responding officers are suspicious about the nature of the burglary and investigate further, finding an empty hidden compartment behind his couch. After reconsidering the offer to join Davis & Main, Jimmy decides to accept.
12	2	"Cobbler"	Terry McDonough	Gennifer Hutchison	February 22, 2016	2.23
Howard visits Chuck and informs him about Jimmy's employment at Davis & Main, the latter expresses concern about it. Mike encounters Daniel (Pryce) arriving at the police station for an interview about his stolen baseball cards. Mike warns Pryce that the police must suspect that he is a drug dealer and offers to find the cards himself to keep him from talking to the police. Mike tracks down Nacho and threatens to inform Tuco about Nacho's secret drug deals if Nacho does not return the cards. Nacho agrees to return Daniel's cards plus $10,000 in exchange for Daniel's Hummer. Chuck visits the HHM office, where he sits in on a meeting with Davis & Main, unnerving Jimmy. Jimmy receives a call from Mike asking him to represent Daniel. Jimmy deflects police attention from Daniel by telling investigators the secret compartment in his living room was used to hold fetish videos. When Jimmy tells Kim about staging a video with Daniel as part of his effort to convince the police, Kim disapproves and tells Jimmy that his willingness to engage in unethical behavior will jeopardize his position at D&M.
13	3	"Amarillo"	Scott Winant	Jonathan Glatzer	February 29, 2016	2.20
Jimmy bribes a Sandpiper Crossing bus driver to allow him to solicit a bus full of residents on their way to lunch. At an HHM meeting, Jimmy presents his client outreach report and informs the group that he has signed up several new clients for the class action lawsuit. Chuck is suspicious of Jimmy's methods, but Jimmy deflects the question. Kim warns Jimmy to keep his methods legitimate, since she recommended him to Davis & Main, and his actions will reflect on her judgment. In an effort to reach more clients, Jimmy creates and then airs a commercial about the lawsuit, which proves a success. Jimmy claims to Kim that he got approved, only for him to be scolded by Cliff Main for airing it behind his back. Meanwhile, Stacey voices concern to Mike about gunshots she heard in her neighborhood over the previous two nights. Mike does overnight surveillance without Stacey's knowledge, learning the sound is the arrival of the morning papers. The following morning, Stacey claims there were three more gunshots, and points out a chip in the corner of her outside wall that she tearfully insists is from a bullet, so Mike decides to move her out of the house. Mike visits Dr. Caldera for new job offers, and receives a lucrative one from Nacho.
14	4	"Gloves Off"	Adam Bernstein	Gordon Smith	March 7, 2016	2.20
Jimmy is scolded by the Davis & Main partners, angry at him for running a commercial without their consent, but Cliff gives him a second chance. Kim meets with Howard and Chuck—Howard reprimands her for not informing them about Jimmy's commercial and demotes her to entry-level work in the document review office. Meanwhile, Nacho is concerned about Tuco's erratic behavior and the possibility that he might find out about his secret deals. Nacho wants Mike to kill Tuco, but Mike decides against it, arguing that Tuco's death would draw attention from the Salamancas and the cartel. Instead, Mike stages a fender bender with Tuco's car and goads Tuco into attacking him, having called the police beforehand. The police arrive during the altercation and arrest Tuco for assault with a deadly weapon since he was carrying a gun.
15	5	"Rebecca"	John Shiban	Ann Cherkis	March 14, 2016	1.99
In a flashback, Jimmy visits Chuck shortly after moving to Albuquerque. He meets Chuck's wife, Rebecca, and succeeds in charming her, making Chuck uncomfortable; Chuck's later attempt to imitate Jimmy falls flat. In the present, Jimmy meets Kim in the HHM document room and proposes she sue the firm. Kim refuses, pointing out that no firm would ever hire her again, and tells Jimmy not to worry about her job. She calls many professional and school contacts, hoping to land a major new client for HHM. She secures the business of the Mesa Verde Bank, a local institution planning to expand regionally. Howard is pleased to have the lucrative new client, but does not give Kim credit, and keeps her in document review. Later, Chuck tells Kim his belief that Jimmy embezzled money from their family convenience store in Cicero, which led to the store's failure. Meanwhile, Mike is approached by Tuco's uncle, Hector Salamanca, who offers Mike $5,000 to claim that Tuco's gun was actually Mike's, which would reduce Tuco's jail sentence.
16	6	"Bali Ha'i"	Michael Slovis	Gennifer Hutchison	March 21, 2016	2.11
Jimmy has difficulty adjusting to his new job at D&M; unable to sleep in his corporate apartment, he returns to his old boiler room office to sleep. With Chuck's help, Kim is reinstated to her old position at HHM, but is treated coldly by Howard who gives her humiliating and menial assignments, including arguing an unwinnable motion in court. Kim is offered a job by Rich Schweikart of Schweikart & Cokely, who was impressed with her performance. Unsure how to proceed, Kim relieves her stress by running another con with Jimmy, fooling an investor into giving them a $10,000 check, which Kim keeps as a souvenir. Meanwhile, Mike refuses Hector's deal, but Hector wages an intimidation campaign. Two of his subordinates break into Mike's house to scare him, and Leonel and Marco Salamanca silently threaten to kill Kaylee. Mike agrees to say the gun was his but demands $50,000, which Hector agrees to pay. Mike gives $25,000 to Nacho and explains that since Tuco's sentence will be reduced, Mike has failed to uphold his part of their deal, so he is obligated to give Nacho half of the payment.
17	7	"Inflatable"	Colin Bucksey	Gordon Smith	March 28, 2016	2.03
In a flashback to the early 1970s, thirteen-year-old Jimmy is working in his family's store when a grifter enters and attempts to con Jimmy's father by claiming to be a needy parent with an emergency. Jimmy does not believe him and tries to warn his father, but his father is more concerned about helping someone who might be in need. When the grifter reveals the con, a disillusioned Jimmy steals money from the store. In 2002, Jimmy represents Mike when Mike claims to the district attorney that the gun in his altercation with Tuco was not Tuco's. Jimmy decides to quit D&M but learns that if he quits, he will have to repay the firm's signing bonus, although his contract allows him to keep it if he is fired without cause. He begins irritating his D&M co-workers with flashy displays, and Cliff eventually fires him. Jimmy tries to convince Kim to partner with him in their own law firm. She later suggests they start separate firms, sharing office space and expenses and lending each other support. Meanwhile, Mike promises to buy Stacey a new house in a safer neighborhood and begins surveilling Hector's restaurant.
18	8	"Fifi"	Larysa Kondracki	Thomas Schnauz	April 4, 2016	1.93
Kim tells Howard she is leaving HHM. Howard wishes her well, and immediately after Kim leaves, they each race to secure the Mesa Verde account. Kim meets with Kevin and Paige, who agree that Kim will be Mesa Verde's outside counsel. Kim and Jimmy set up their practices in a re-purposed dentists' office. Howard informs Chuck of Kim's resignation, the loss of Mesa Verde, and Kim's teaming with Jimmy. Chuck damns Kim with faint praise at a meeting with Kevin and Paige, causing Kevin to keep Mesa Verde's business at HHM. Jimmy perpetrates a ruse at a U.S. Air Force base in order to gain access to the B-29 bomber FIFI and shoot video footage for use in TV ads promoting his law practice. Jimmy learns about Chuck meeting with Kevin and Paige, and stays with him while he recovers at home. While Chuck is asleep, Jimmy takes the Mesa Verde documents to a copy store, alters them, then replaces them in Chuck's files. While surveilling Hector, Mike follows a cargo truck to a remote garage, then returns home and uses a length of garden hose to assemble a homemade spike strip.
19	9	"Nailed"	Peter Gould	Peter Gould	April 11, 2016	2.06
A disguised Mike ambushes one of Hector's trucks, extracts the $250,000 hidden in a tire, and leaves the driver tied up nearby. Mike admits to Nacho that he wanted to attract police attention to Hector, but Nacho informs him a "Good Samaritan" freed the driver, and police were not notified; Hector then arrived with a crew to clean up the scene and killed the Good Samaritan. Chuck's application for a new Mesa Verde branch is incorrect, causing a long delay. Kevin re-engages Kim as outside counsel and Chuck suspects Jimmy sabotaged him. Chuck accuses Jimmy in front of Kim, but she says the mistake was Chuck's. Kim infers Jimmy's guilt and implies that if there is evidence, Chuck will find it. Jimmy realizes the copy store clerk can identify him, so he goes there to buy the clerk's silence. Ernesto is investigating copy stores for Chuck and Jimmy sees him leave after conversing with the clerk. While Jimmy observes from across the street, Chuck begins to question the clerk, but his electromagnetic hypersensitivity causes him to faint and hit his head. Jimmy considers entering the store to render aid.
20	10	"Klick"	Vince Gilligan	Heather Marion & Vince Gilligan	April 18, 2016	2.26
In a flashback, Chuck and Jimmy are beside their mother's hospital bed and Jimmy leaves to buy sandwiches. Their mother wakes and calls Jimmy's name before dying. Jimmy returns and asks Chuck if their mother awakened or had any last words, and Chuck falsely says "no". In 2002, Jimmy rushes into the copy store where Chuck has hit his head, comforting him while they wait for an ambulance. Meanwhile, Mike intends to kill Hector with a black market sniper rifle and positions himself on a ridge overlooking the site where Hector and his crew intend to execute Ximenez, the driver. Before he can, he detects the sound of his car horn and when he investigates he finds a branch wedged against the steering wheel and a note with the word "Don't" left on his windshield. Chuck tells Jimmy his mistake on Mesa Verde's paperwork made him question his judgment, so he is retiring. Feeling guilty about deceiving Chuck, Jimmy confesses to tampering with the documents and bribing the copy store clerk. After Jimmy leaves, Chuck unveils a tape recorder he activated prior to Jimmy's arrival.

== Release ==
=== Home media ===
The second season was released on Blu-ray and DVD in region 1 on November 15, 2016; bonus features include audio commentaries for every episode and several behind-the-scenes featurettes.

== Reception ==
=== Critical response ===
Better Call Saul season 2: Critical reception by episode
Season 2 (2016): Percentage of positive critics' reviews tracked by the website Rotten Tomatoes

The second season of Better Call Saul received acclaim from critics. On Rotten Tomatoes, the second season has a score of 97%, based on 182 reviews, with an average rating of 8.7/10. The site's critical consensus reads, "Better Call Saul continues to tighten its hold on viewers with a batch of episodes that inject a surge of dramatic energy while showcasing the charms of its talented lead." On the review aggregator website Metacritic, the second season has a score of 85 out of 100, based on 18 critics, indicating "universal acclaim".

Terri Schwartz of IGN rated the season an 8.7 out of 10, praising the acting performances and cinematography, but criticizing the lack of focus, stating, "There's a lot to love in Season 2 of Better Call Saul, but still some elements to improve upon." Chuck Bowen of Slant Magazine gave it a perfect four star review and wrote, "the show's writing is as economic and poetically parred [as its visual aesthetic]. Each moment is compact, leading to the next with unpredictable, behaviorally astute precision". Daniel D'Addario of Time praised the show's ability to stand out as a spin-off but retain some of the elements of its predecessor, writing, "in its second season, ... Better Call Saul allows us into a new world of complexity by deepening one of the show's pivotal relationships. It's the best-case scenario for a spin-off: a show that occupies a familiar world but opens up entirely new themes."

==== Critics' top ten list ====
2016
- No. 1 NPR (Fresh Air)
- No. 2 Collider
- No. 3 TV Guide
- No. 4 IndieWire
- No. 5 Complex
- No. 7 RogerEbert.com
- No. 7 Time
- No. 7 Variety (Sonia Saraiya)
- No. 2 Vulture (Jen Chaney)
- No. 8 Esquire
- No. 8 Paste
- No. 8 Slant Magazine
- No. 9 Consequence
- No. 9 Uproxx
- No. 10 Adweek
- – Yahoo!

=== Ratings ===
Viewership and ratings per episode of Better Call Saul season 2
No.	Title	Air date	Rating (18–49)	Viewers (millions)	DVR (18–49)	DVR viewers (millions)	Total (18–49)	Total viewers (millions)
1	"Switch"	February 15, 2016	1.1	2.57	1.0	2.14	2.1	4.71^{1}
2	"Cobbler"	February 22, 2016	1.0	2.23	1.0	2.14	2.0	4.37^{1}
3	"Amarillo"	February 29, 2016	1.0	2.20	1.2	2.61	2.2	4.81
4	"Gloves Off"	March 7, 2016	0.9	2.20	1.2	2.59	2.1	4.79
5	"Rebecca"	March 14, 2016	0.8	1.99	1.2	2.63	2.0	4.62
6	"Bali Ha'i"	March 21, 2016	0.9	2.11	1.0	2.14	1.9	4.25^{1}
7	"Inflatable"	March 28, 2016	0.8	2.03	1.2	2.61	2.0	4.64
8	"Fifi"	April 4, 2016	0.8	1.93	1.2	2.68	2.0	4.61
9	"Nailed"	April 11, 2016	0.8	2.06	1.2	2.67	2.0	4.73
10	"Klick"	April 18, 2016	0.8	2.26	1.2	2.52	2.0	4.78

^1 Live + seven-day DVR playback viewership was unavailable, so live + three-day is listed instead.

== Accolades ==
Ceremony	Category	Recipients	Result
32nd TCA Awards	Outstanding Achievement in Drama	Better Call Saul	Nominated
32nd TCA Awards	Individual Achievement in Drama	Bob Odenkirk	Nominated
68th Primetime Creative Arts Emmy Awards	Outstanding Single-Camera Picture Editing for a Drama Series	Kelley Dixon ("Rebecca")	Nominated
68th Primetime Creative Arts Emmy Awards	Outstanding Single-Camera Picture Editing for a Drama Series	Kelley Dixon and Chris McCaleb ("Nailed")	Nominated
68th Primetime Creative Arts Emmy Awards	Outstanding Sound Mixing for a Comedy or Drama Series	Phillip W. Palmer, Larry Benjamin, Kevin Valentine ("Klick")	Nominated
68th Primetime Creative Arts Emmy Awards	Outstanding Special Visual Effects in a Supporting Role	For the episode "Fifi"	Nominated
68th Primetime Emmy Awards	Outstanding Drama Series	Better Call Saul	Nominated
68th Primetime Emmy Awards	Outstanding Lead Actor in a Drama Series	Bob Odenkirk	Nominated
68th Primetime Emmy Awards	Outstanding Supporting Actor in a Drama Series	Jonathan Banks	Nominated
7th Critics' Choice Television Awards	Best Drama Series	Better Call Saul	Nominated
7th Critics' Choice Television Awards	Best Actor in a Drama Series	Bob Odenkirk	Won
7th Critics' Choice Television Awards	Best Supporting Actor in a Drama Series	Michael McKean	Nominated
2016 American Film Institute Awards	Television Programs of the Year	Better Call Saul	Won
74th Golden Globe Awards	Best Actor – Television Series Drama	Bob Odenkirk	Nominated
21st Satellite Awards	Best Drama Series	Better Call Saul	Nominated
21st Satellite Awards	Best Actor in a Drama Series	Bob Odenkirk	Nominated
21st Satellite Awards	Best Supporting Actor in a Series, Miniseries or TV Film	Jonathan Banks	Nominated
21st Satellite Awards	Best Supporting Actress in a Series, Miniseries or TV Film	Rhea Seehorn	Won
53rd Cinema Audio Society Awards	Outstanding Achievement in Sound Mixing for Television Series – One Hour	Phillip W. Palmer, Larry B. Benjamin, Kevin Valentine, Matt Hovland and David Michael Torres ("Klick")	Nominated
69th Writers Guild of America Awards	Drama Series	Better Call Saul	Nominated
69th Writers Guild of America Awards	Episodic Drama	Gordon Smith ("Gloves-Off")	Nominated
69th Writers Guild of America Awards	Episodic Drama	Heather Marion and Vince Gilligan ("Klick")	Nominated
69th Writers Guild of America Awards	Episodic Drama	Thomas Schnauz ("Switch")	Nominated

== Related media ==
=== Better Call Saul: Saul Goodman and the Justice Consortium in the Clutches of the Judgernaut! ===
AMC released a digital comic book as a tie-in for Better Call Saul titled, Better Call Saul: Saul Goodman and the Justice Consortium in the Clutches of the Judgernaut! in February 2016, prior to the season two premiere.

=== Talking Saul ===
Talking Saul is a live aftershow hosted by Chris Hardwick, which features guests discussing episodes of Better Call Saul. These episodes discussed the season two premiere and finale episodes of Better Call Saul.
