= Thomas Schnauz =

American television producer and television writer

- Born: 1966 or 1967 (age 59–60); Kearny, New Jersey, U.S.
- Education: New York University
- Occupations: Television producer; writer
- Years active: 2001–present

Thomas Schnauz (born 1966 or 1967) is an American television producer and television writer. His credits include The X-Files, The Lone Gunmen, Night Stalker, Reaper, Breaking Bad, and Better Call Saul.

== Personal life ==
Schnauz was born in Kearny, New Jersey. He graduated from New York University's Tisch School of the Arts in 1988, where he first met fellow student Vince Gilligan, who graduated the following year.

== Career ==
Schnauz started his career in various production jobs. His first screenplay was called Spirits in Passing. He eventually joined Vince Gilligan on the writing staff of The X-Files and its spinoff show, The Lone Gunmen. He also co-wrote the screenplays for the 2008 film Otis and the 2008 television film Infected. In 2010, he re-teamed with Gilligan on Breaking Bad, where he remained through the show's 2013 conclusion.

Schnauz signed a two-year overall deal with Sony Pictures Television in November 2014.

Schnauz served as co-executive producer on AMC's Breaking Bad spinoff series Better Call Saul. He has written and/or directed a number of its episodes including "Pimento", the penultimate episode of the show's first season, which received critical acclaim, as well as "Plan and Execution", the finale of the sixth season's first half that also received praise for Schnauz's writing.

In April 2015, it was reported that he had been tapped to write the screenplay for "a revisionist take" on "Jack and the Beanstalk", also to be produced by Vince Gilligan.

In 2019, Schnauz joined other WGA writers in firing their agents as part of the WGA's stand against the ATA and the practice of packaging.

== Filmography ==
Writer

Year	Show	Season	Episode title	Episode	Notes
2001	The Lone Gunmen	1	"Madam, I'm Adam"	6	
2001	The Lone Gunmen	1	"Tango de los Pistoleros"	10	
2001	The X-Files	9	"Lord of the Flies"	5	
2002	The X-Files	9	"Scary Monsters"	14	
2005	Night Stalker	1	"The Five People You Meet in Hell"	2	
2007	Reaper	1	"What About Blob"	5	
2007	Reaper	1	"Ashes to Ashes"	9	
2008	Reaper	1	"Coming to Grips"	15	
2009	Reaper	2	"I Want My Baby Back"	5	
2010	Breaking Bad	3	"One Minute"	7	
2010	Breaking Bad	3	"Abiquiu"	11	Co-written with John Shiban
2011	Breaking Bad	4	"Shotgun"	5	
2011	Breaking Bad	4	"Bug"	9	Co-written with Moira Walley-Beckett
2011	Breaking Bad	4	"End Times"	12	Co-written with Moira Walley-Beckett
2012	Breaking Bad	5	"Say My Name"	7	Also directed
2013	Breaking Bad	5	"Buried"	10	
2014	Resurrection	1	"Unearth"	2	
2015	The Man in the High Castle	1	"The Illustrated Woman"	3	
2015	The Man in the High Castle	1	"Revelations"	4	
2015	Better Call Saul	1	"Nacho"	3	
2015	Better Call Saul	1	"Pimento"	9	Also directed
2016	Better Call Saul	2	"Switch"	1	Also directed
2016	Better Call Saul	2	"Fifi"	8	
2017	Better Call Saul	3	"Witness"	2	
2017	Better Call Saul	3	"Sabrosito"	4	Director only
2017	Better Call Saul	3	"Expenses"	7	Also directed
2018	Better Call Saul	4	"Breathe"	2	
2018	Better Call Saul	4	"Winner"	10	Co-written with Peter Gould
2020	Better Call Saul	5	"Wexler v. Goodman"	6	
2020	Better Call Saul	5	"Bad Choice Road"	9	Also directed
2022	Better Call Saul	6	"Carrot and Stick"	2	Co-written with Ariel Levine
2022	Better Call Saul	6	"Plan and Execution"	7	Also directed
2022	Better Call Saul	6	"Breaking Bad"	11	Also directed
2025	Gen V	2	"Hell Week"	7	Also directed

Production staff

Year	Show	Role	Notes
2001	The X-Files	Story Editor	Season 9
2002	The X-Files	Story Editor	Season 9
2005	Night Stalker	Executive Story Editor	Season 1
2006	Night Stalker	Executive Story Editor	Season 1
2007	Reaper	Co-producer	Season 1
2008	Reaper	Co-producer	Season 1
2009	Reaper	Producer	Season 2
2010	Breaking Bad	Producer	Season 3
2011	Breaking Bad	Supervising producer	Season 4
2012	Breaking Bad	Co-executive producer	Season 5
2013	Breaking Bad	Co-executive producer	Season 5
2014	Resurrection	Co-executive producer	Season 1
2015	Better Call Saul	Co-executive producer	Season 1
2016	Better Call Saul	Executive producer	Season 2
2017	Better Call Saul	Executive producer	Season 3
2018	Better Call Saul	Executive producer	Season 4
2020	Better Call Saul	Executive producer	Season 5
2022	Better Call Saul	Executive producer	Season 6
2025	Gen V	Executive producer	Season 2

Screenplays

Year	Title	Credit	Notes
2008	Infected	Writer	TV movie. Story by Tom Schnauz
2008	Otis	Writer	Co-wrote with Erik Jendresen

== Awards and nominations ==
Schnauz has been nominated for Writers Guild of America Awards on six occasions, winning four times, for his work on the writing staffs of Breaking Bad and Better Call Saul. His Better Call Saul episode Plan and Execution won Best Episodic Drama in 2023 at the WGA Awards. Schnauz shared in the show's 2010 Dramatic Series nomination, and subsequent category wins in 2011, 2012 and 2013, for his work on Breaking Bad. He was nominated again in 2015 and 2016 in the Dramatic Series category for Better Call Saul.

He was nominated for a Primetime Emmy Award for Outstanding Writing in a Drama Series for the 2012 Breaking Bad episode "Say My Name" and in 2022 for the Better Call Saul episode Plan and Execution

Year	Award	Category	Show	Result
2010	Writers Guild of America Award	Best Dramatic Series	Breaking Bad	Nominated
2010	Primetime Emmy Award	Outstanding Drama Series	Breaking Bad	Nominated
2010	Producers Guild of America Award	Best Episodic Drama	Breaking Bad	Nominated
2011	Writers Guild of America Award	Best Dramatic Series	Breaking Bad	Won
2012	Primetime Emmy Award	Outstanding Drama Series	Breaking Bad	Nominated
2012	Writers Guild of America Award	Best Dramatic Series	Breaking Bad	Won
2012	Producers Guild of America Award	Best Episodic Drama	Breaking Bad	Nominated
2013	Primetime Emmy Award	Outstanding Writing for a Drama Series	Breaking Bad	Nominated
2013	Primetime Emmy Award	Outstanding Drama Series	Breaking Bad	Won
2013	Writers Guild of America Award	Best Dramatic Series	Breaking Bad	Won
2013	Producers Guild of America Award	Best Episodic Drama	Breaking Bad	Won
2014	Primetime Emmy Award	Outstanding Drama Series	Breaking Bad	Won
2014	Producers Guild of America Award	Best Episodic Drama	Breaking Bad	Won
2015	Primetime Emmy Award	Outstanding Drama Series	Better Call Saul	Nominated
2015	Writers Guild of America Award	Best Dramatic Series	Better Call Saul	Nominated
2015	Producers Guild of America Award	Best Episodic Drama	Better Call Saul	Nominated
2016	Primetime Emmy Award	Outstanding Drama Series	Better Call Saul	Nominated
2016	Writers Guild of America Award	Best Dramatic Series	Better Call Saul	Nominated
2016	Producers Guild of America Award	Best Episodic Drama	Better Call Saul	Nominated
2017	Primetime Emmy Award	Outstanding Drama Series	Better Call Saul	Nominated
2019	Primetime Emmy Award	Outstanding Drama Series	Better Call Saul	Nominated
2019	Primetime Emmy Award	Outstanding Writing for a Drama Series	Better Call Saul	Nominated
2020	Primetime Emmy Award	Outstanding Drama Series	Better Call Saul	Nominated
2020	Primetime Emmy Award	Outstanding Writing for a Drama Series	Better Call Saul	Nominated
2022	Primetime Emmy Award	Outstanding Drama Series	Better Call Saul	Nominated
2022	Primetime Emmy Award	Outstanding Writing for a Drama Series	Better Call Saul	Nominated
