= Rebecca (Better Call Saul) =

- Better Call Saul episode
- Episode no.: Season 2 Episode 5
- Directed by: John Shiban
- Written by: Ann Cherkis
- Original air date: March 14, 2016
- Running time: 45 minutes

Guest appearances
- Kerry Condon as Stacey Ehrmantraut; Ann Cusack as Rebecca Bois; Jessie Ennis as Erin Brill; Rex Linn as Kevin Wachtell; Omar Maskati as Omar; Cara Pifko as Paige Novick; Peter Diseth as DDA Bill Oakley; John Christian Love as Ernesto; Abigail Zoe Lewis as Kaylee Ehrmantraut; Debrianna Mansini as Fran; Mark Margolis as Hector Salamanca

Episode chronology
← Previous "Gloves Off"	Next → "Bali Ha'i"
- Better Call Saul season 2

"Rebecca" is the fifth episode of the second season of the American television drama series Better Call Saul, the spinoff series of Breaking Bad. Written by Ann Cherkis and directed by John Shiban, "Rebecca" aired on AMC in the United States on March 14, 2016. Outside of the United States, the episode premiered on streaming service Netflix in several countries.

== Plot ==
=== Opening ===
In a flashback to 1992, Chuck McGill has not yet experienced the symptoms of his supposed electromagnetic hypersensitivity, and he easily changes a light bulb in his dining room chandelier. Jimmy McGill visits Chuck's house shortly after moving to Albuquerque. During dinner, Chuck's wife, Rebecca Bois, is charmed by Jimmy's personality and charisma, which makes Chuck visibly uncomfortable.

=== Main story ===
Jimmy sees Kim Wexler in the HHM document review room, where she is relegated to entry-level work, and proposes that she sue HHM for discrimination and creating a hostile work environment. Kim rejects this idea, suggesting it would be career suicide because no one would ever hire her again. She tells Jimmy to worry about his own job while she worries about hers. Throughout his day, Jimmy is accompanied by junior associate Erin Brill, who claims to want to help Jimmy fit in better at D&M, though Jimmy realizes Clifford Main directed her to "babysit" him in the wake of the controversy over his TV ad.

Kim decides that bringing a major new client to HHM is the best way to escape document review, so she spends her free time calling contacts from law school, law firms, and local businesses. Kim capitalizes on one of these relationships to land Mesa Verde Bank, meaning the potential of millions of dollars in revenue for HHM. Howard Hamlin is happy to have the new client, but minimizes Kim's contribution, and keeps her working in document review.

Chuck visits the office one night where he runs into Kim. After promising to work on Kim's transfer out of document review, he tells her a story about when Jimmy and Chuck's father ran a store in Cicero, Illinois. According to Chuck, Jimmy embezzled money, which eventually led to the store's failure and their father's death. As a result, Chuck is always skeptical of Jimmy's schemes and plans.

Mike Ehrmantraut is approached by Hector Salamanca, the leader of the Salamanca drug cartel and Tuco Salamanca's uncle. Hector has no issue with Tuco spending time in prison as a learning experience, but objects to the length of the sentence he will receive for assault with a deadly weapon. He offers Mike $5,000 to tell police the gun at the scene of the fight was Mike's, which will result in a reduction of Tuco's prison time.

== Production ==
During the opening scene, Chuck and Rebecca discuss creating a signal based on an ear-tugging move made famous by Carol Burnett. Burnett herself would later join the series for the role of Marion during the show's final season.

== Reception ==
=== Ratings ===
Upon airing, the episode received 1.99 million American viewers, and an 18–49 rating of 0.8.

=== Critical reception ===
The episode received positive reviews from critics. It holds a 93% positive rating with an average score of 8.42 out of 10 on the review aggregator site Rotten Tomatoes. The critics' consensus reads: "The effectively subtle and refined "Rebecca" sheds light on the McGill brothers' relationship while focusing on the ways Kim is affected by the fallout from Jimmy's mistakes."

Terri Schwartz of IGN gave the episode a 9.0 rating, writing "Better Call Saul took the focus off Jimmy for a great Kim and Chuck episode."

For her work on this episode, Kelley Dixon was nominated for Outstanding Single-Camera Picture Editing for a Drama Series at the 68th Primetime Creative Arts Emmy Awards.
