= Marco (Better Call Saul) =

- Better Call Saul episode
- Episode no.: Season 1 Episode 10
- Directed by: Peter Gould
- Written by: Peter Gould
- Original air date: April 6, 2015
- Running time: 49 minutes

Guest appearances
- Mel Rodriguez as Marco Pasternak; Keith Kupferer as Cameron; Amy Davidson as Sabrina; John Christian Love as Ernesto

Episode chronology
← Previous "Pimento"	Next → "Switch"
- Better Call Saul season 1

"Marco" is the tenth and final episode of the first season of the American television drama series Better Call Saul, the spinoff series of Breaking Bad. Written and directed by series co-creator Peter Gould, "Marco" aired on AMC in the United States on April 6, 2015. Outside of the United States, the episode premiered on streaming service Netflix in several countries.

== Plot ==
=== Opening ===
In a flashback to 1992, Jimmy McGill has been released from jail (Note: As seen in "Nacho".) with Chuck McGill's help. Jimmy agrees to Chuck's demand that he move to Albuquerque to live an honest life. Before leaving Cicero, Illinois, he goes to a favorite bar to say goodbye to Marco Pasternak, his partner in crime.

=== Main story ===
Jimmy gives the Sandpiper case to HHM (Note: As seen in "Pimento".) and reveals he figured out Chuck was sabotaging his career. Howard Hamlin apologizes for his involvement and gives Jimmy his $20,000 of counsel fee. Jimmy then requests that Howard take over caring for Chuck.

Jimmy calls bingo at the local senior center. After an improbable string of numbers beginning with "B", he fixates on words beginning with that letter which remind him of Chuck. Jimmy rants about taking revenge in Illinois against someone named Chet by defecating through the sunroof of Chet's car (the "Chicago Sunroof") without realizing Chet's children were in the back seat. Facing the possibility of registering as a sex offender if convicted, Jimmy asked Chuck for help. Chuck got the charges dropped but Jimmy blames this event for their feud.

Jimmy returns to Cicero and reunites with Marco. After running a scam on an unsuspecting businessman, they spend several days running cons. At the end of the week, Jimmy explains he is an attorney and must return to Albuquerque to see to his clients. Marco convinces Jimmy to stay for one last con. While running the scam, Marco suffers a heart attack and dies. Jimmy inherits Marco's pinky ring, which he begins to wear even though it is too big.

Kim Wexler calls Jimmy to report the Sandpiper case has grown too big for HHM, requiring them to partner with Davis & Main. Because of Jimmy's rapport with the clients, D&M is interested in hiring him. Jimmy arranges to meet the D&M partners at the courthouse, but changes his mind and drives away. He stops to ask Mike Ehrmantraut why they did not keep the money they took from the Kettlemans. (Note: As seen in "Bingo".) Mike recalls Jimmy did not take it because he wanted to do the "right thing" and says he did not because Jimmy hired him to do a job and he did it. Jimmy assures Mike he will not make the same mistake again and drives off while humming "Smoke on the Water", the song Marco was humming just before he died.

== Production ==
This episode was written and directed by series co-creator Peter Gould, who also wrote "Uno" and "Mijo" earlier this season.

According to Gould, all the scams depicted in the episode are based on real-life cases.

The fictitious Equatorial Uqbar Orbis that Jimmy mentions during a scam is a reference to the Jorge Luis Borges story "Tlön, Uqbar, Orbis Tertius".

During the montage of scams, Marco speaks the line, "Hey, kid, help me get my wife's car out of this bad neighborhood."

In the episode, a woman who had sex with Jimmy after he tricked her into thinking he was Kevin Costner realizes he lied. This is a reference to the Breaking Bad episode "Abiquiu", where Saul (Jimmy) tells Walter White, "I once told a woman I was Kevin Costner, and it worked because I believed it."

== Reception ==
=== Ratings ===
Upon airing, the episode received 2.53 million American viewers, and an 18-49 rating of 1.2; including Live+7 ratings, the finale was watched by 5.76 million viewers, and had a 2.8 18-49 rating overall.

=== Critical response ===
The episode received a highly positive reception from critics. On Rotten Tomatoes, based on 27 reviews, it received an 89% approval rating with an average score of 8.55 out of 10. The site's consensus reads, "The investment into Better Call Saul's first season pays off with a finale that is at once comic and tragic, as Jimmy's conversion to Saul nears completion."

Roth Cornet of IGN gave the episode a 9.0 rating, concluding, "Better Call Saul gave us an exemplary first season of television. The finale brought us to the moment where Jimmy made the decision to abandon his attempt to walk a righteous path and, instead, give over to his baser drives and desires. A more open-ended conclusion may have felt more emotionally impactful. On the whole, though, this was a gorgeously designed and executed episode; one that leaves enough room for – what we hope will be – an equally extraordinary second season." The Telegraph rated the episode 4 out of 5 stars.

=== Accolades ===
At the 67th Primetime Creative Arts Emmy Awards, Kelley Dixon and Chris McCaleb were nominated for Outstanding Single-Camera Picture Editing for a Drama Series for their work on this episode, while Phillip W. Palmer, Larry Benjamin, and Kevin Valentine were nominated for Outstanding Sound Mixing for a Comedy or Drama Series. The episode and its sound mixers, Phillip W. Palmer, Larry B. Benjamin, Kevin Valentine, Matt Hovland, and David Michael Torres, received a 2016 Cinema Audio Society Award nomination for Outstanding Achievement in Sound Mixing for Television Series – One Hour. Production designer Tony Fanning was nominated for his work on this episode, alongside "Five-O" and "RICO", Excellence in Production Design for a One-Hour Contemporary Single-Camera Series at the Art Directors Guild Awards 2015, which held on January 31, 2016.
