= Elisha Yaffe =

American actor and comedian

- Born: Ann Arbor, Michigan, U.S.
- Education: Pioneer Valley Performing Arts Charter Public School, Emerson College
- Alma mater: Emerson College
- Occupations: Actor; comedian; writer; producer
- Website: elisha.tv

Elisha Yaffe is an American actor, comedian, writer and producer. He has appeared in television shows including Better Call Saul, The Newsroom, Mad Men, Southland, Up All Night, The New Normal and CSI: NY and voiced the characters of Jimmy Olsen and B'dg on DC Nation Shorts's Tales of Metropolis and Super-Pets.

He has co-created webseries, including Downers Grove, Minor Stars and Remember When. He has appeared in commercials for Mike's Hard Lemonade, Time Warner Cable, Samsung, Wendy's, McDonald's, Nintendo 3DS, Progressive, and Hanes.

== Life and career ==
Yaffe is from Amherst, Massachusetts, where he was a founding member of the Valley Arts Project, a non-profit dedicated to supporting the development of young artists. Yaffe organized the project's Valley Arts Festival, which featured performances by up and coming artists in the Pioneer Valley area, including a then-unknown Sonya Kitchell. He is a graduate of Emerson College.

After college, he formed Sorry, Dad Productions with Michael Blaiklock, Dave Horwitz, and Justin Becker. Together, they produced the slacker comedy "Downers Grove" for Warner Brothers Studio 2.0. He was named to the Heeb 100 in 2010.

== Film and television ==
Film and Television
| Year | Film | Role | Notes |
|---|---|---|---|
| 2010 | Downers Grove | Pudge | Web series, 9 episodes |
| 2010 | Remember When | Elisha | Web series, 3 episodes |
| 2011 | Minor Stars | Dougie | Web series, 3 episodes |
| 2011 | Roommate Meeting | Elisha | Web series, 3 episodes |
| 2012 | CSI: NY | Master Chief | 2 episodes |
| 2012 | Mad Men | Stewart | Episode: "Christmas Waltz" |
| 2012 | Last Remnants | Richard Hill | Short film |
| 2012 | Housemates of Horror | Theo | CollegeHumor Original |
| 2012 | Up All Night | Clerk | Episode: "I Can't Quit You" |
| 2012 | Echo Chamber | Lead/Writer/Director | Short film |
| 2012 | Figurines | Lead/Writer | Short film |
| 2013 | The New Normal | Noel | Episode: "Stay-at-Home Dad" |
| 2013 | Southland | Jerry | Episode: "Hats and Bats" |
| 2013 | Expecting | Barry | |
| 2013 | DC Nation Shorts | Various | 4 episodes |
| 2014 | Decay | Aaron | |
| 2014 | Off the Grid | Elisha | Short film |
| 2014 | Mighty Med | Bob | Episode: "Two Writers Don't Make a Wrong" |
| 2014 | Time Travel Lover | Matt | |
| 2014 | The Newsroom | Eddie | Episode: "Episode #3.1" |
| 2014 | Comedy Bang! Bang! | Mr. Hunchy's P.A. | Episode: "Josh Groban Wears a Pantsuit and Socks" |
| 2015 | Smosh: The Movie | High Driver | Movie |
| 2015 | Contracted: Phase II | Mormon #2 | Movie |
| 2015 | Hey Dude, Hey Man | Dude | Short film |
| 2015 | One Shot | Theatergoer | Movie |
| 2015 | Frank & Lola | Will | Movie |
| 2016 | Pop Music | Trevor | Short film |
| 2016 | Better Call Saul | Lance | 3 episodes |
| 2016 | Welcome Back | Director/Writer | 1 episode |
| 2016 | Disconnected | Executive Producer | 14 episodes |
| 2017 | Then The Letting Go | Elisha | Short film |
| 2017 | Bobby Chew Sells a Car | Executive Producer | 1 episode |
| 2017 | Band Aid | Bartender | Feature film |
| 2018 | We Are CVNT5 | Showrunner/co-EP | 8 episodes |
