= Namaste (Better Call Saul) =

- Better Call Saul episode
- Episode no.: Season 5 Episode 4
- Directed by: Gordon Smith
- Written by: Gordon Smith
- Editing by: Skip Macdonald
- Original air date: March 9, 2020
- Running time: 46 minutes

Guest appearances
- Dean Norris as Hank Schrader; Kerry Condon as Stacey Ehrmantraut; Steven Michael Quezada as Steven Gomez; Rex Linn as Kevin Wachtell; Cara Pifko as Paige Novick; Barry Corbin as Everett Acker; Harrison Thomas as Lyle; Jeremiah Bitsui as Victor; David DeLaO as Diego; Sasha Feldman as Sticky; Morgan Krantz as Ron; Tim De Zarn as Mr. Harkness; Keong Sim as Ko; Frances Lee McCain as Judge Chapak

Episode chronology
← Previous "The Guy for This"	Next → "Dedicado a Max"
- Better Call Saul season 5

"Namaste" is the fourth episode of the fifth season of the AMC television series Better Call Saul, a spin-off series of Breaking Bad. The episode aired on March 9, 2020, on AMC in the United States. Outside of the United States, the episode premiered on the streaming service Netflix in several countries.

== Plot ==
After a night of drinking and sex, Jimmy McGill and Kim Wexler head to work. (Note: The morning after the closing scene of "The Guy for This".) Jimmy convinces Sticky and Ron, two drug users who had his "50% off" business cards, (Note: As depicted in "50% Off".) to keep him as their counsel when they seem ready to accept a free public defender. Jimmy later has lunch with Howard Hamlin, who admits HHM wronged Jimmy in the past, but says the feud was between Jimmy and Chuck McGill, and offers him the chance to join HHM, though Jimmy is dubious. As Howard drives away, Jimmy sees he has a vanity plate reading "NAMAST3".

Kim recommends an alternate building site to Kevin Wachtell and Paige Novick that will enable Mesa Verde to work around Everett Acker's refusal to vacate his home, but they insist on eviction. Kim looks on as Jimmy uses the Saul Goodman persona in a courtroom con that achieves a mistrial. She asks Jimmy to represent Acker against Mesa Verde, and Acker agrees. After buying three bowling balls at a pawn shop, (Note: As seen in in medias res during the cold open.) Jimmy flings them over Howard's front gate, damaging his expensive car.

The Albuquerque Police and DEA stake out Gus Fring's dead drops. Diego collects the money before being chased, and escapes through a small tunnel after abandoning the cash. While Hank Schrader is disappointed they did not get information on the higher-ups, the DEA and police celebrate the seizure of the drug money and the arrests of the three men who made the drug drops. Diego and Victor contact Gus with an update. At Los Pollos Hermanos, Gus has been seething in anger over the loss of the dead drops and venting his frustration on assistant manager Lyle by making him repeatedly clean the fryers. After Gus receives the call, Lyle asks if the fryers are clean enough, and Gus alludes to the dead drops by replying that the fryers are "acceptable".

Mike Ehrmantraut arrives at Stacey's home to watch Kaylee, but finds she hired another babysitter. She tells Mike she does not feel comfortable leaving Kaylee with him as a result of his previous outburst. (Note: As depicted in "50% Off".) As Mike is walking home, he is set upon by the street thugs he previously encountered. (Note: As seen in "The Guy for This".) They beat and stab him, and Mike wakes up in a pueblo at an unknown location.

== Production ==
"Namaste" is the directorial debut of Gordon Smith, who had started off as a production assistant on Breaking Bad before becoming a screenwriter for both that show and Better Call Saul. In addition, Smith wrote the screenplay. The episode marks the final appearance of Dean Norris in the Breaking Bad franchise as Hank Schrader.

Namaste is a Sanskrit customary greeting; in the episode, it is depicted on the vanity license plate ("NAMAST3") of Howard's car.

== Reception ==
"Namaste" received critical acclaim. On Rotten Tomatoes, it garnered a 92% rating with an average score of 8.21/10 based on 14 reviews. The site's critical consensus is, "Everyone is struggling to keep their cool in a Better Call Saul entry that meticulously sets up the season's storytelling pins, racking up suspense for the impending bowling ball that'll knock everything down."

=== Ratings ===
"Namaste" was watched by 1.22 million viewers on its first broadcast, which was a slight increase from the previous week of 1.18 million.
