= Dedicado a Max =

- Better Call Saul episode
- Promotional poster
- Episode no.: Season 5 Episode 5
- Directed by: Jim McKay
- Written by: Heather Marion
- Original air date: March 16, 2020
- Running time: 50 minutes

Guest appearances
- JB Blanc as Dr. Barry Goodman; Dennis Boutsikaris as Rich Schweikart; Rex Linn as Kevin Wachtell; Cara Pifko as Paige Novick; Barry Corbin as Everett Acker; Keiko Agena as Viola Goto; Steven Ogg as Sobchak; John DiMaggio as The Construction Foreman; Alejandra Flores as Mrs. Cortazar

Episode chronology
← Previous "Namaste"	Next → "Wexler v. Goodman"
- Better Call Saul season 5

"Dedicado a Max" (Spanish for "Dedicated to Max") is the fifth episode of the fifth season of the AMC television series Better Call Saul, a spin-off series of Breaking Bad. The episode aired on March 16, 2020, on AMC in the United States. Outside of the United States, the episode premiered on the streaming service Netflix.

In the episode, Mike awakes in Mexico at one of Gus's ranches after the beatdown in the previous episode. Meanwhile, Jimmy and Kim draw themselves closer in the Acker vs. Mesa Verde case.

== Plot ==
Mike Ehrmantraut wakes on a ranch just inside the Mexican border that is owned by Gus Fring and includes a fountain dedicated to Max Arciniega. He finds his stab wounds (Note: As seen in "Namaste".) were treated by Dr. Barry Goodman, who cautions him to stay and heal in the care of Señora Cortazar, the housekeeper and cook. Mike calls Gus to learn his intent, but Gus hangs up. Days later, Gus arrives and asks for Mike's help. Mike refuses to become a "button man" and engage in killing simply to further Gus' war against the Salamancas, but Gus says he wants Mike with him because Mike understands the need for revenge.

Howard Hamlin phones Jimmy McGill and inquires if he has considered his offer to join HHM; Jimmy claims he is still thinking it over. Jimmy creates delays in Mesa Verde's eviction of Everett Acker, (Note: As seen in "The Guy for This".) including changing Acker's street number to claim the eviction notices are for the wrong address, planting fake Native American artifacts and low-level radioactive material, and passing off a spray-painted image of Jesus on Acker's home as a miracle. Kim Wexler tries to remove herself from the case by claiming a conflict of interest due to Jimmy's involvement, but Kevin Wachtell insists she remain. As matters relating to Acker's eviction arrive at Schweikart & Cokely, Kim assigns them to the firm's associates, claiming they have expertise that she does not. Facing further delays, Rich Schweikart encourages Kevin to follow Kim's plan to locate Mesa Verde's call center at an alternate site, but Kevin adamantly demands Acker's eviction.

Kim resigns herself to Acker's eviction. Jimmy suggests they could find "dirt" on Kevin and blackmail him into compromising, but counsels against doing it. Kim decides to proceed, and Jimmy agrees. After Mike refuses the job, Jimmy hires Sobchak, who surveils Kevin and surreptitiously searches his house. Sobchak tells Jimmy and Kim that his search of Kevin's home revealed nothing damaging. Jimmy dismisses Sobchak from their meeting after he suggests kidnapping Kevin. Kim's knowing smile as she looks through Sobchak's photos indicates she found something on Kevin. Rich suggests that Kim temporarily disengage from all Mesa Verde business, correctly deducing that she asked Jimmy to sabotage their efforts. She refuses and angrily denies the allegations in front of their co-workers.

== Production ==
On the Better Call Saul Insider podcast, showrunner Peter Gould said Mike's scenes in this episode were partially inspired by the television show The Prisoner. Gould said that while Mike was not trapped on Gus' villa as with The Prisoner, the idea of being stuck in one place and using that as a form of self-reflection helped move Mike's character from what was established within Better Call Saul toward what audiences had come to know within Breaking Bad, through Gus showing Mike a more personal side while standing next to the fountain that reminds Gus of Max. Giancarlo Esposito, who plays Gus, described in an interview with Variety that the idea of the villa setting was for Gus to share with Mike the idea of the utopia that Gus wanted, one where there may be need for enforcement via the armed guards, but otherwise everyone was free to enjoy life. Esposito said the scene was to try to show Mike how this setting contrasted with what was happening with events in Albuquerque with Lalo disrupting Gus' operations, and why Gus needed to recruit Mike to help.

The scenes of Gus' ranch were filmed at El Rancho de las Golondrinas, a historic rancho that currently operates as a living history museum located near Santa Fe, New Mexico.

Bill Burr was originally slated to reprise his Breaking Bad character Patrick Kuby, who was to surveil Kevin's house during the episode. However, scheduling fell through due to Burr needing to attend to a personal matter. The role was rewritten for Steven Ogg's character Sobchak instead.

== Reception ==
"Dedicado a Max" was well received by critics. At Rotten Tomatoes, it received a perfect 100% approval from 14 reviews with an average 7.93/10 review rating, with a summary "It's all coming together in 'Dedicado a Max,' a callback-heavy installment that thrillingly expands on the characters of Mike and Kim, with Rhea Seehorn's performance a highlight."

=== Ratings ===
"Dedicado a Max" was watched by 1.45 million viewers on its first broadcast, which was an increase from the previous week of 1.22 million.
