= Better Call Saul season 5 =

Fifth season of the AMC crime drama television series

Better Call Saul
- Season 5
- Home media cover art
- Showrunner: Peter Gould
- Starring: Bob Odenkirk; Jonathan Banks; Rhea Seehorn; Patrick Fabian; Michael Mando; Tony Dalton; Giancarlo Esposito
- No. of episodes: 10

Release
- Original network: AMC
- Original release: February 23 – April 20, 2020

Season chronology
- ← Previous; Season 4 Next → Season 6

The fifth season of the AMC television series Better Call Saul premiered on February 23, 2020, in the United States, and concluded on April 20, 2020. The ten-episode season was broadcast on Mondays at 9:00 pm (Eastern) in the United States, except for the premiere which aired on a Sunday. Bob Odenkirk, Jonathan Banks, Rhea Seehorn, Patrick Fabian, Michael Mando, and Giancarlo Esposito reprise their roles from previous seasons and are joined by Tony Dalton, promoted to the main cast from his recurring role in the previous season. Better Call Saul is a spin-off prequel to Breaking Bad and was also created by Vince Gilligan; co-creator Peter Gould also worked on the series.

The fifth season picks up where the fourth left off, also taking place in 2004, four years before Jimmy McGill (Odenkirk) meets Walter White (Bryan Cranston) and Jesse Pinkman (Aaron Paul). The season shows the further evolution of Jimmy into the titular character, criminal defense lawyer "Saul Goodman", after regaining his law license, while fully rejecting the goodwill that Howard Hamlin (Fabian) extends to him in the wake of his brother Chuck's death. Kim Wexler (Seehorn) is dismayed by Jimmy's secretive and sporadic nature as well as her own willingness to go along with Jimmy's morally ambiguous motives to move ahead in her casework. Lalo Salamanca's (Dalton) presence in Albuquerque disrupts Gus Fring's (Esposito) legitimate restaurant business and his reputation with the drug cartel. Both Nacho Varga (Mando), fearing for his father's safety, and Mike Ehrmantraut (Banks), who is struggling to cope with his killing of Werner Ziegler, are caught between Gus and Lalo's conflict, eventually drawing Jimmy and Kim in.

The season was widely praised by critics, particularly for its performances and heightened tension compared to earlier seasons, and received four nominations at the 72nd Primetime Emmy Awards, including for Outstanding Drama Series.

== Cast and characters ==
=== Main ===
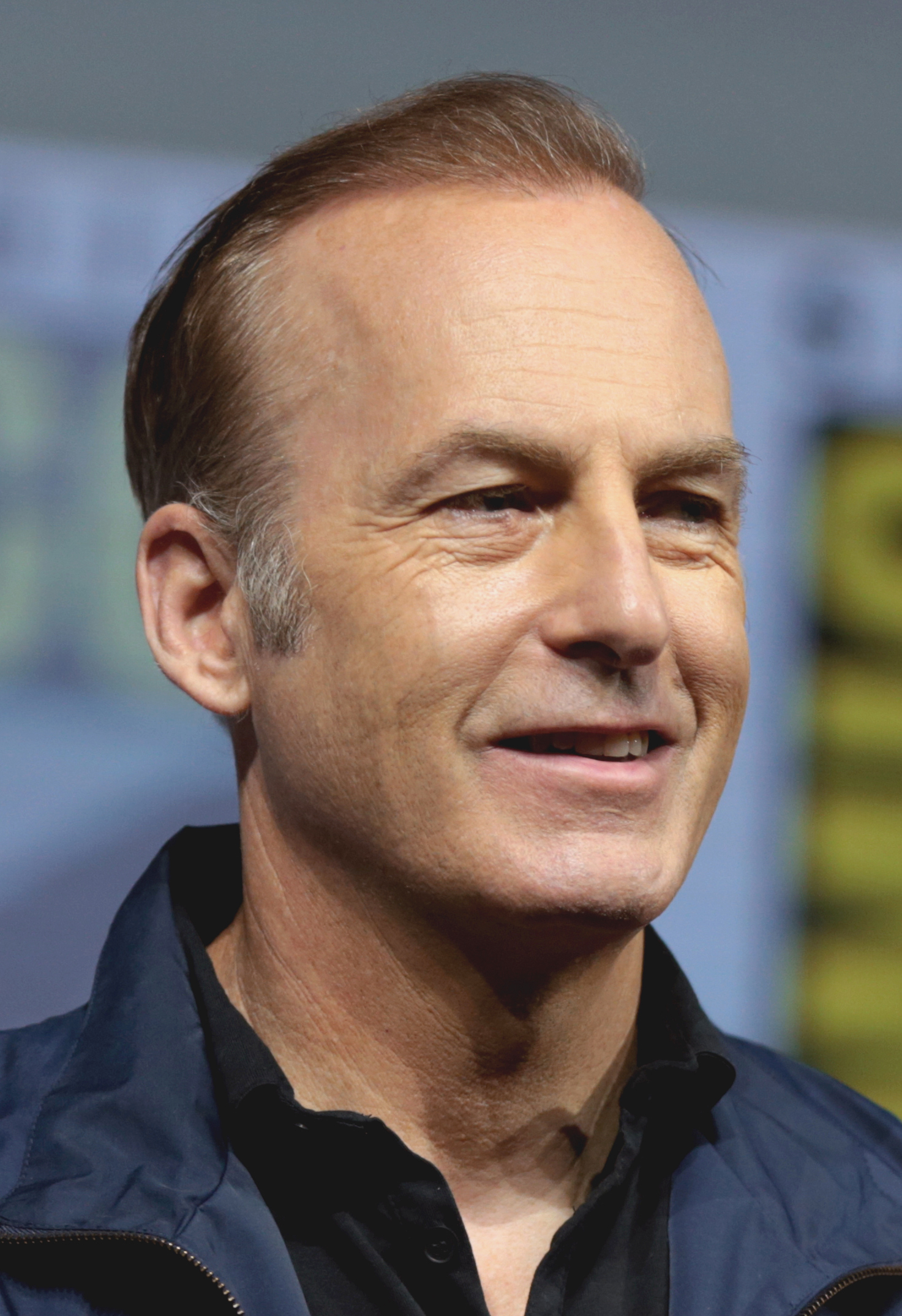
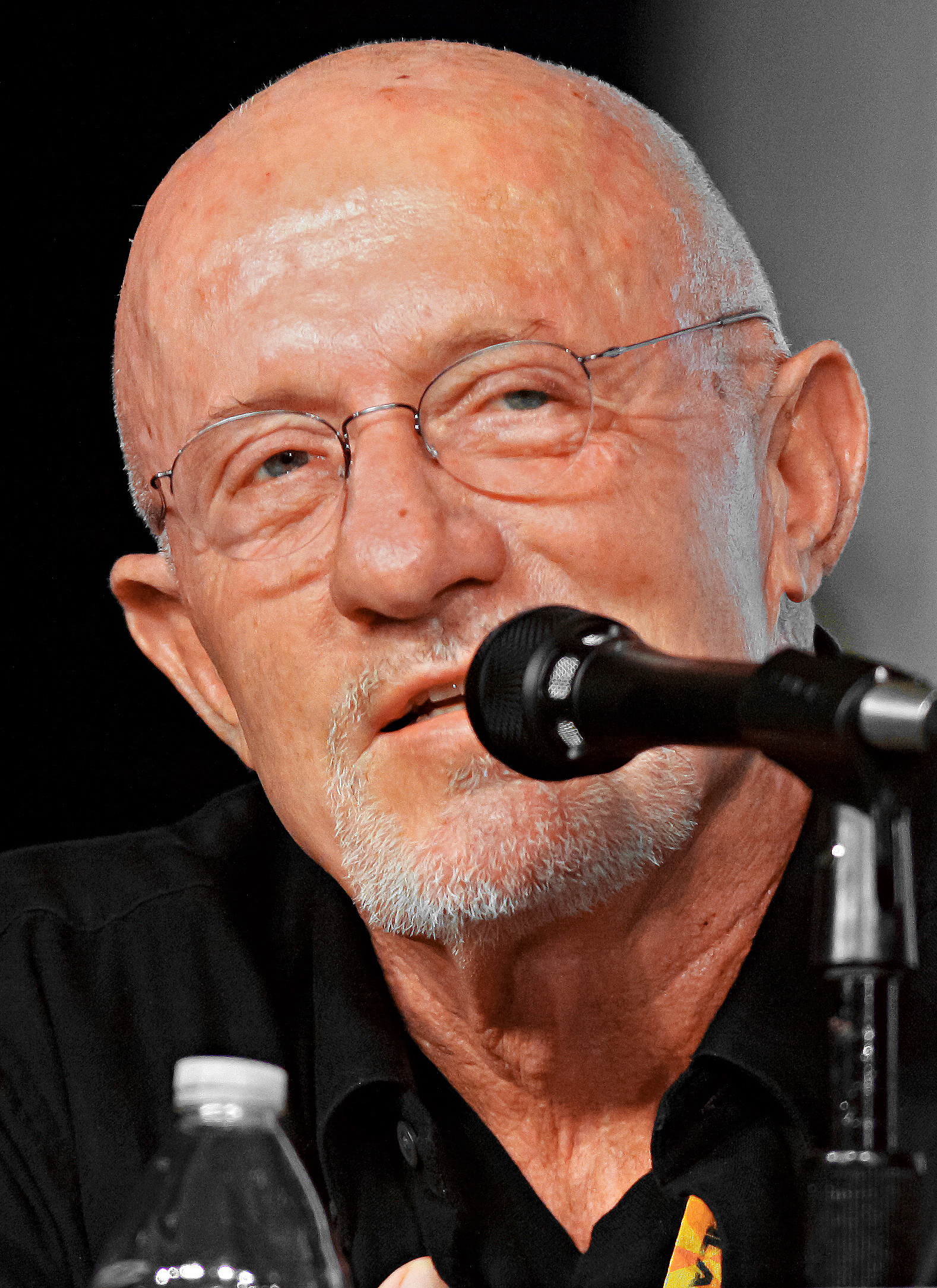
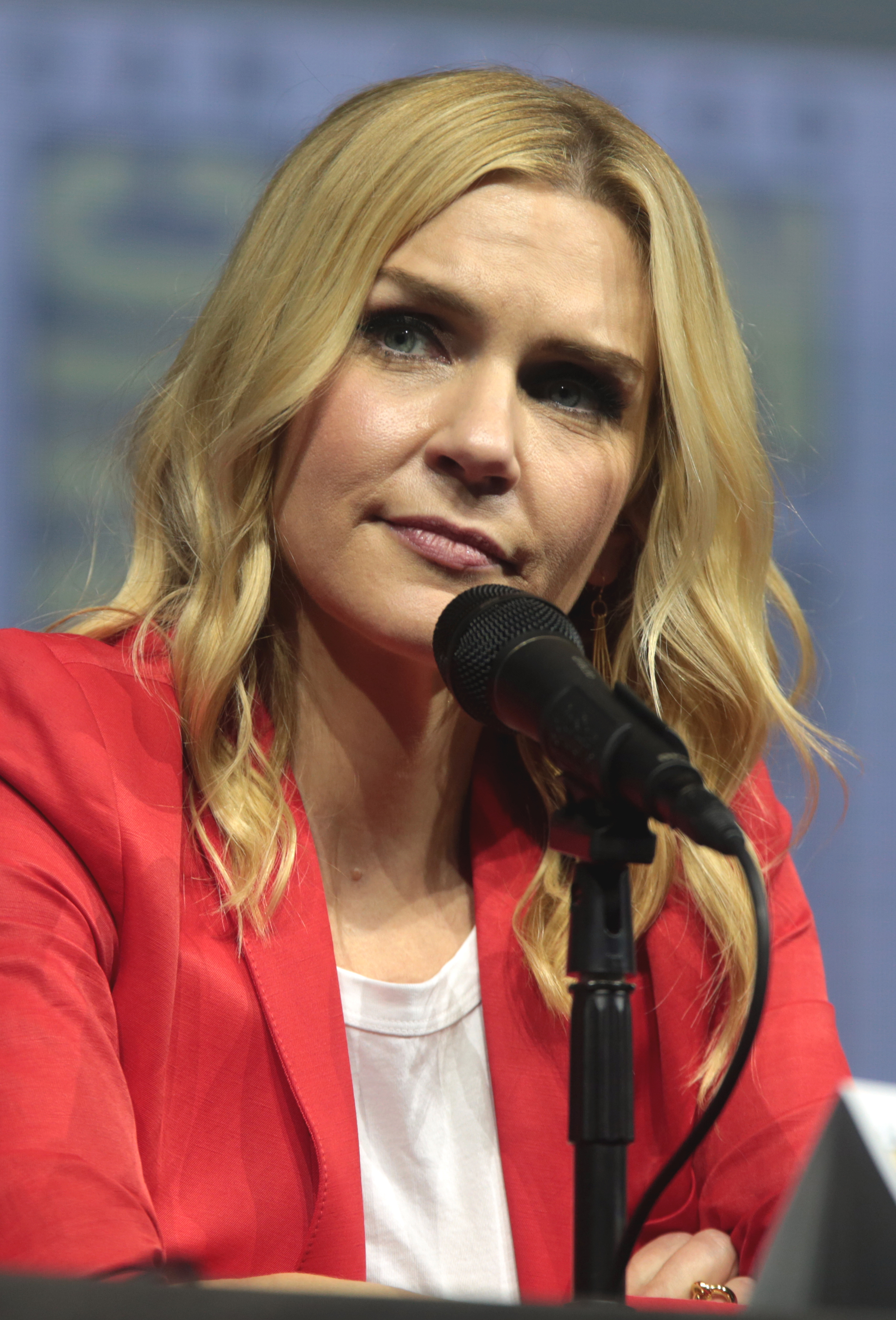
Bob Odenkirk (Jimmy McGill / Saul Goodman), Jonathan Banks (Mike Ehrmantraut), and Rhea Seehorn (Kim Wexler)
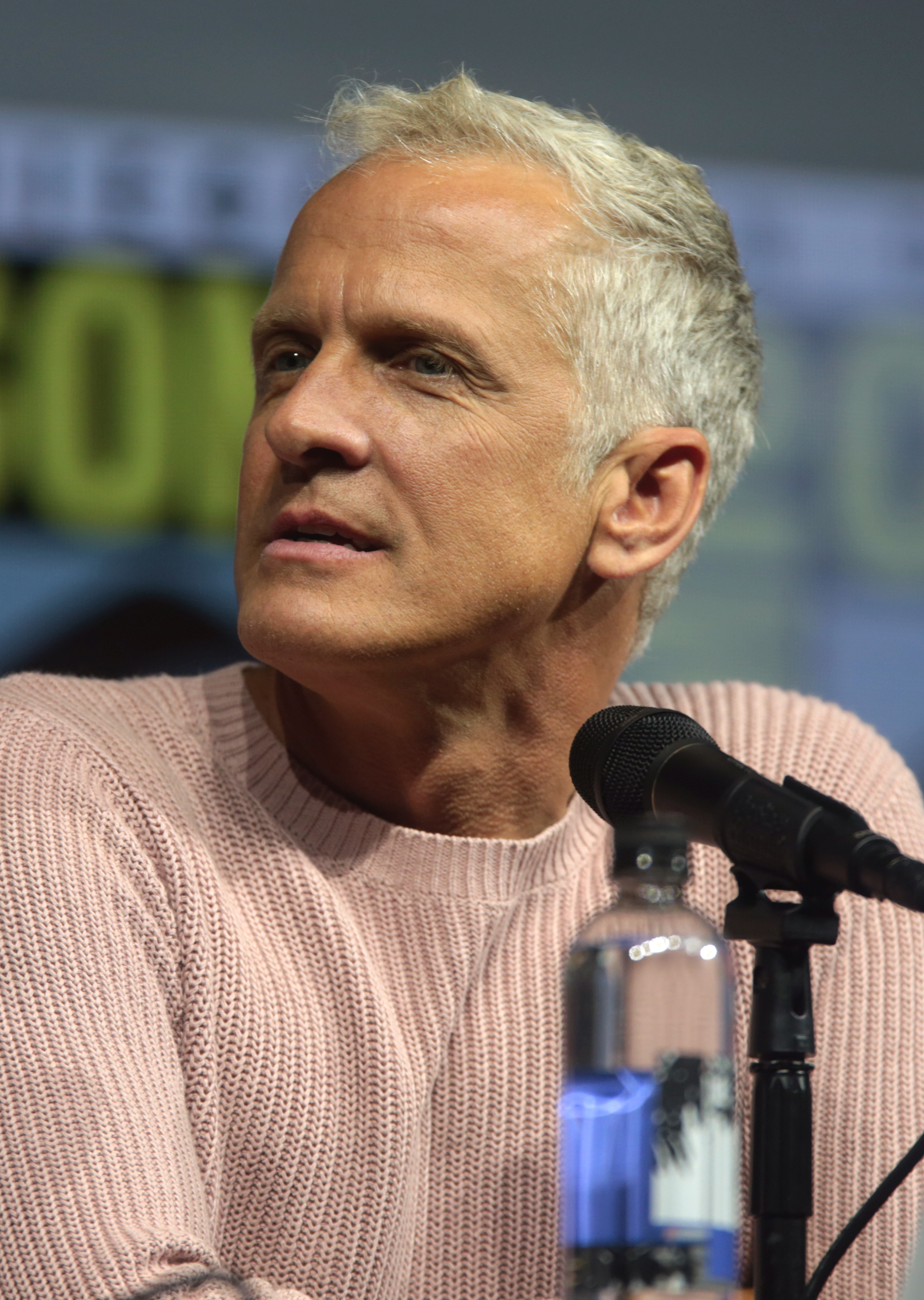
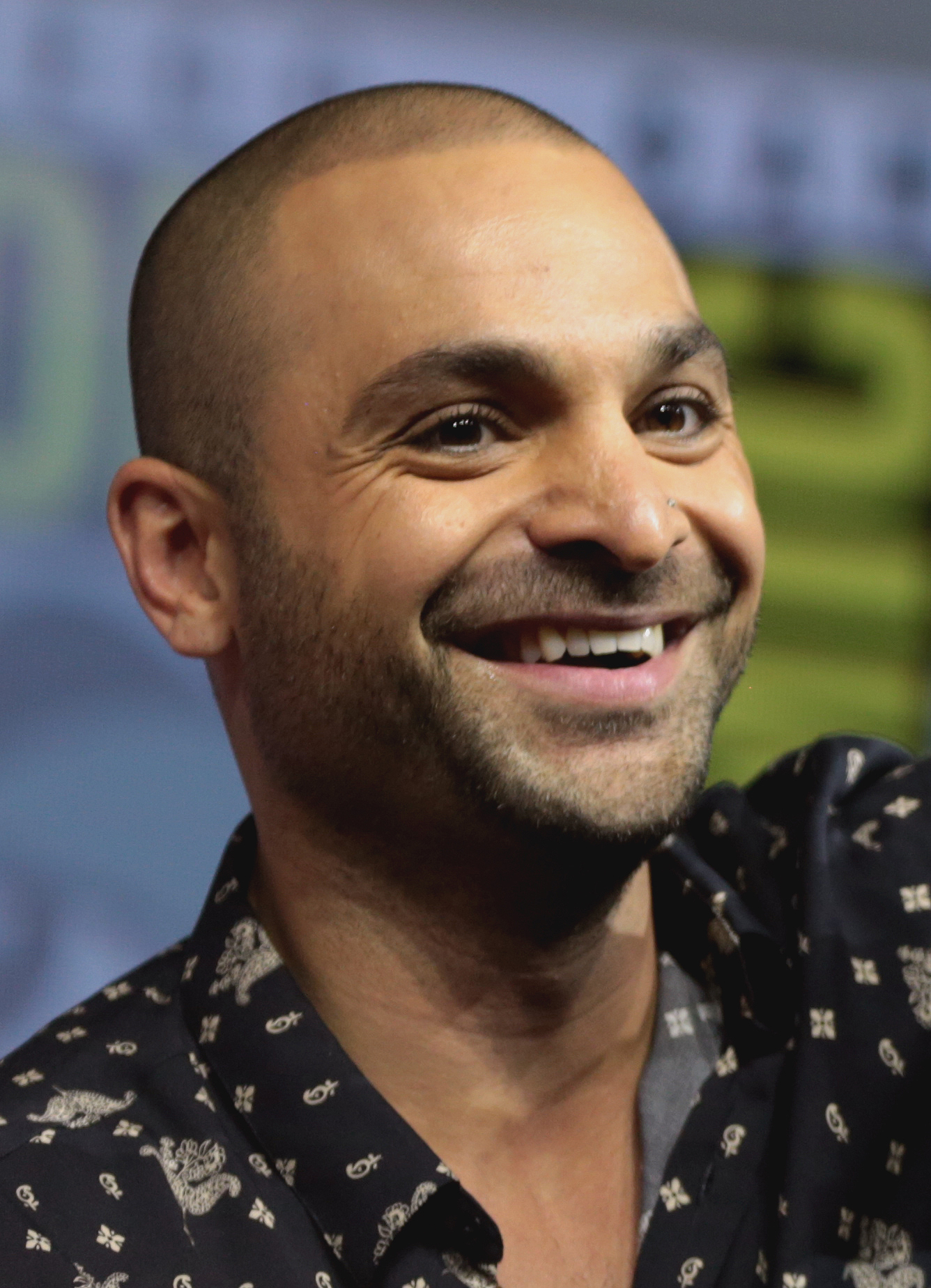
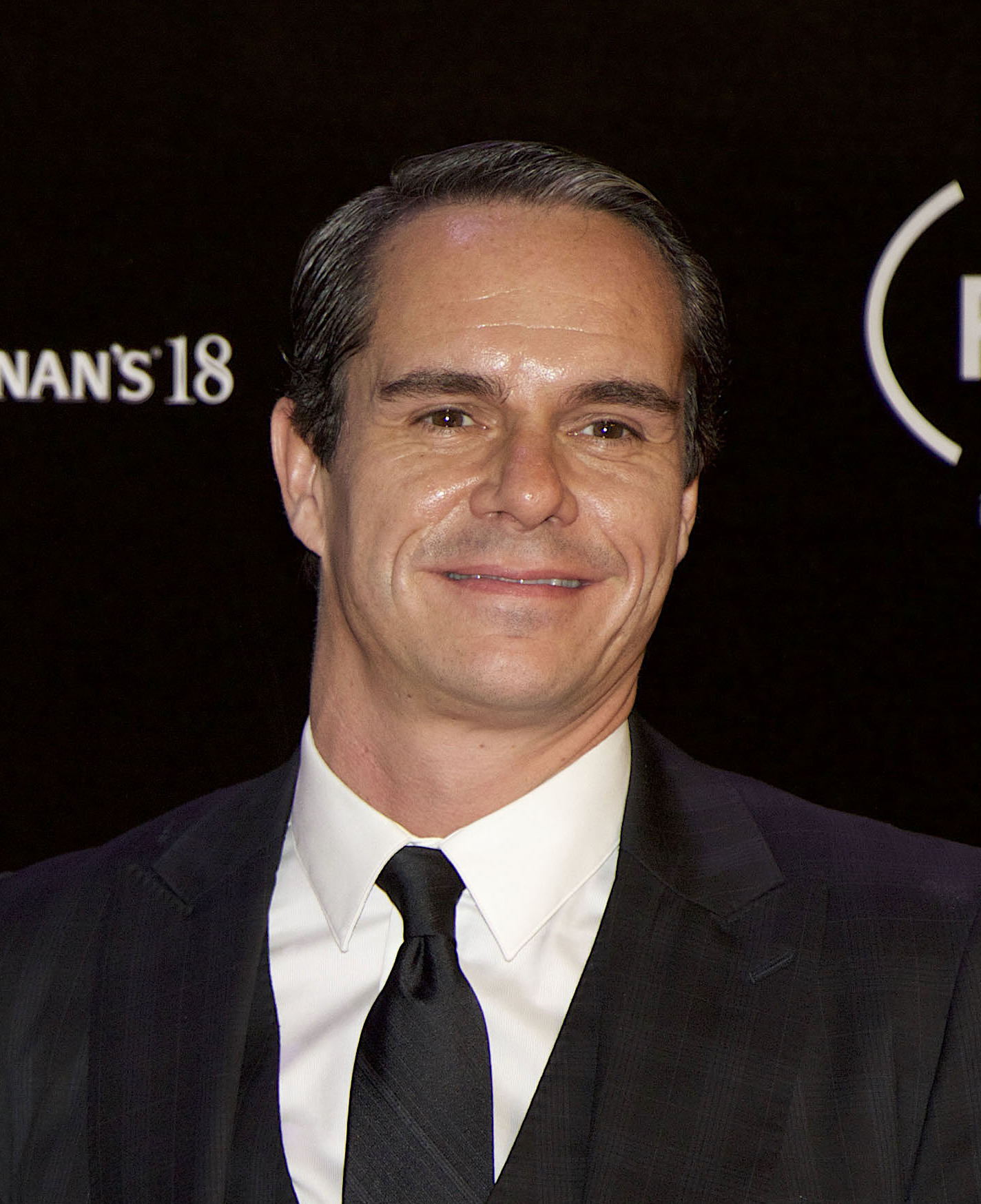
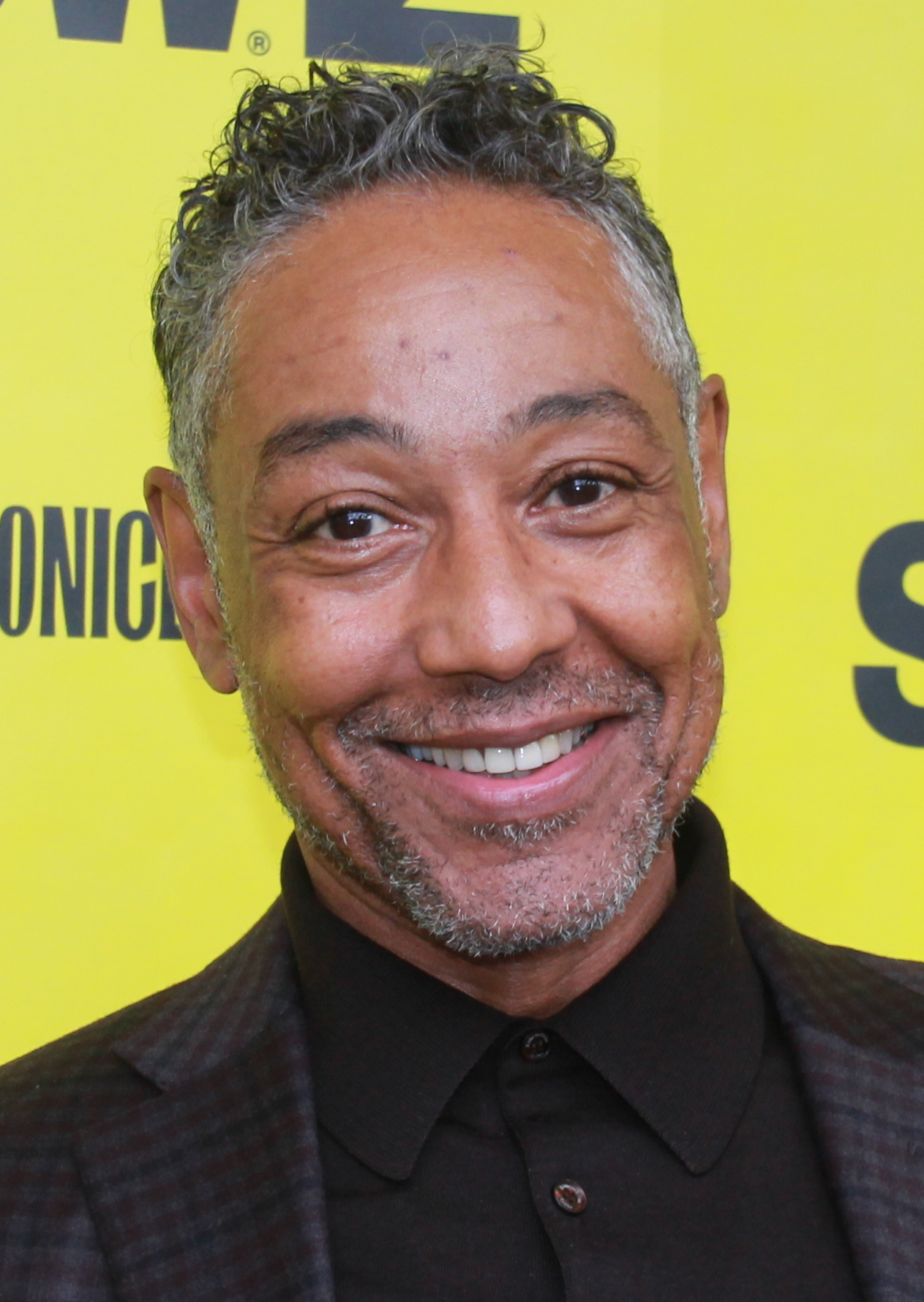
Patrick Fabian (Howard Hamlin), Michael Mando (Nacho Varga), Tony Dalton (Lalo Salamanca), and Giancarlo Esposito (Gus Fring)
- Bob Odenkirk as Jimmy McGill / Saul Goodman, an attorney recently reinstated to the New Mexico bar association who now practices criminal defense law as Saul Goodman. In the present, he manages a Cinnabon store in Omaha under the alias Gene Takavic.
- Jonathan Banks as Mike Ehrmantraut, a Madrigal corporate security consultant and "fixer" for Gus Fring's criminal ambitions.
- Rhea Seehorn as Kim Wexler, primarily a corporate banking lawyer with a moral passion for public defense cases and Jimmy's girlfriend/wife and legal confidant.
  - Katie Beth Hall portrays a young Kim in a flashback in "Wexler v. Goodman".
- Patrick Fabian as Howard Hamlin, the sole managing partner of Hamlin, Hamlin & McGill following Chuck McGill's death in the third season.
- Michael Mando as Nacho Varga, a lieutenant in the drug cartel, now overseeing daily operations in Albuquerque; torn between the vicious Salamanca enforcers and Gus Fring's ambitions for removal of Don Eladio, his allegiance is co-opted by Fring, after trying to kill Hector Salamanca.
- Tony Dalton as Lalo Salamanca, acting head of the brutal Salamanca family of cartel enforcers and a "fixer" for Don Eladio's Albuquerque distribution.
- Giancarlo Esposito as Gus Fring, Chilean national, now Albuquerque narcotics distributor under Don Eladio's cartel; using his fried chicken chain, Los Pollos Hermanos, as a legitimate front.

=== Recurring ===
- Mark Margolis as Hector Salamanca, a once brutal drug enforcer who, following a stroke, has been left unable to walk or speak.
- Max Arciniega as Domingo "Krazy-8" Molina, a meth distributor working for Nacho.
- Sasha Feldman and Morgan Krantz as Sticky and Ron, a pair of drug users and petty criminals who become Jimmy's clients.
- Josh Fadem as Camera Guy, a UNM film student who helps Jimmy on various projects and schemes.
- Hayley Holmes as Make-up Girl, a UNM film student.
- Julian Bonfiglio as Sound Guy, a UNM film student.
- Kerry Condon as Stacey Ehrmantraut, Mike's widowed daughter-in-law and the mother of Kaylee Ehrmantraut.
- Jeremiah Bitsui as Victor, one of Gus's henchmen.
- Ray Campbell as Tyrus Kitt, one of Gus's henchmen.
- Juan Carlos Cantu as Manuel Varga, Nacho's father and an owner of an upholstery shop.
- Dean Norris as Hank Schrader, a DEA agent; reprising his role from Breaking Bad.
- Steven Michael Quezada as Steven Gomez, an Albuquerque DEA agent; reprising his role from Breaking Bad.
- Dennis Boutsikaris as Rich Schweikart, founding partner of Schweikart & Cokely, Kim's boss.
- Barry Corbin as Everett Acker, the homeowner contesting eviction from property that Mesa Verde plans to use for a call center.
- Rex Linn as Kevin Wachtell, CEO of Mesa Verde Bank & Trust.
- Cara Pifko as Paige Novick, senior counsel at Mesa Verde Bank & Trust.
- Lavell Crawford as Huell Babineaux, professional pickpocket, Jimmy's security and fixer.
- Javier Grajeda as Juan Bolsa, a cartel underboss.
- Peter Diseth as Bill Oakley, deputy district attorney.
- Keiko Agena as Viola Gotto, Kim Wexler's paralegal.
- Poppy Liu as Jo.

=== Guests ===
- Robert Forster as Ed Galbraith, a vacuum cleaner repairman who creates new identities for fugitives; reprising his role from Breaking Bad and El Camino.
- Stefan Kapičić as Casper, a member of Werner Ziegler's construction crew.
- Don Harvey as Jeff, the cab driver that recognized Gene as Saul Goodman.
- Ben Bela Böhm as Kai, the demolitions expert on Werner Ziegler's construction crew.
- JB Blanc as Barry Goodman, a doctor on Gus Fring's payroll.
- Steven Ogg as Sobchak / Mr. X, a criminal and private investigator.
- Ed Begley Jr. as Clifford Main, founding partner of the Davis & Main law firm, who employs Jimmy in the second season.
- Norbert Weisser as Peter Schuler, the CEO of Madrigal Electromotive, the parent company of Gus's Los Pollos Hermanos restaurants; reprising his role from Breaking Bad.
- Laura Fraser as Lydia Rodarte-Quayle, a Madrigal Electromotive executive and a liaison to Gus Fring; reprising her role from Breaking Bad.
- Daniel Moncada and Luis Moncada as Leonel and Marco Salamanca (the Cousins), enforcers and hitmen for the cartel.
- Steven Bauer as Don Eladio Vuente, the head of the drug cartel.
- Roy Wood Jr. as Grant, an Albuquerque public defender.
- John DiMaggio as a construction foreman, who oversees the demolition of Everett Acker's home.

== Production ==
=== Development ===
On July 28, 2018, AMC renewed Better Call Saul for a fifth season, just prior to the airing of the fourth season. At the time of renewal, the number of episodes had yet to be specified, and even after the conclusion of the fourth season in October 2018, series co-creator Peter Gould said they were still in discussions with Sony Pictures Television for how long the fifth season would be, given that Better Call Saul had a finite amount of content. In November 2019, AMC confirmed that the fifth season would have ten episodes and would debut on February 23, 2020. On what to expect in the fifth season, Gould said that Jimmy McGill / Saul Goodman's first move is "to try to leverage all the contacts he has in the world of selling drop phones." He also posed a question about Saul's reputation "as not just a criminal lawyer but a criminal lawyer".

=== Casting ===
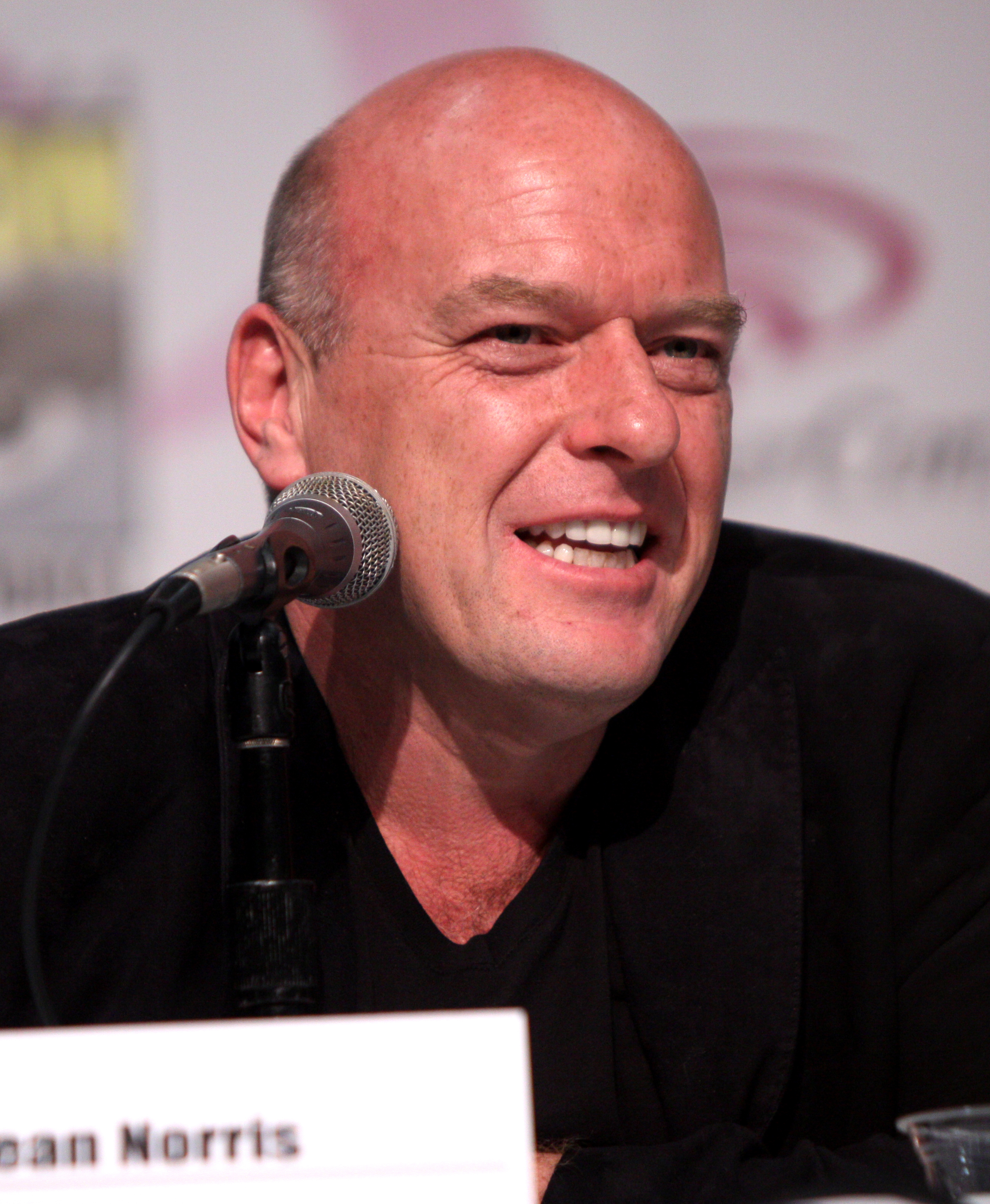
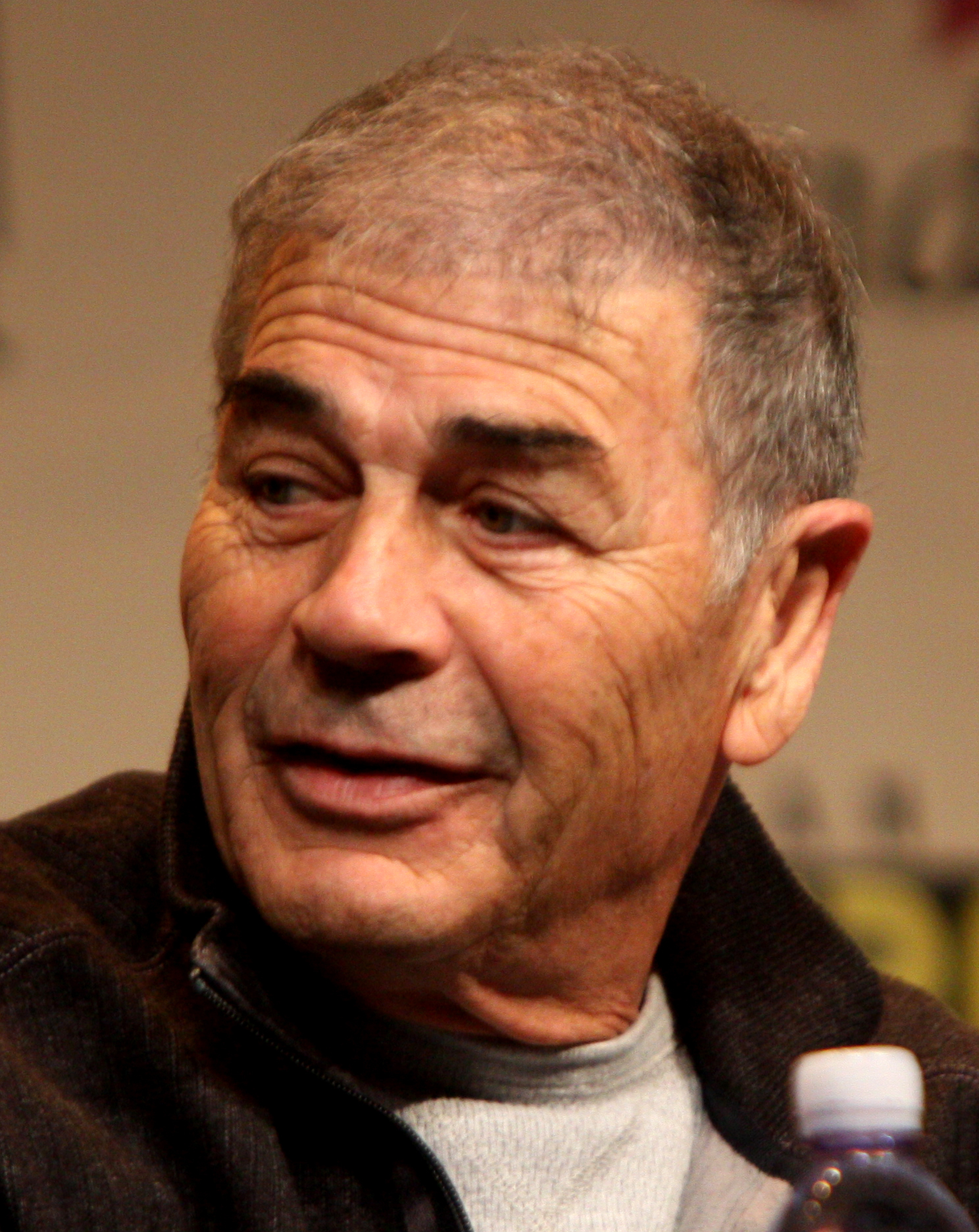
Breaking Bad actors Dean Norris (left) and Robert Forster (right) reprised their roles in this season.

Main cast members Bob Odenkirk, Jonathan Banks, Rhea Seehorn, Patrick Fabian, Michael Mando, and Giancarlo Esposito return from previous seasons as Jimmy McGill / Saul Goodman, Mike Ehrmantraut, Kim Wexler, Howard Hamlin, Nacho Varga, and Gus Fring, respectively. Tony Dalton, who recurred in season four as Lalo Salamanca, was promoted to the main cast for the fifth season.

In January 2020, it was announced that Breaking Bad actors Dean Norris and Steven Michael Quezada would reprise their roles as Hank Schrader and Steven Gomez, along with actor Robert Forster who appeared posthumously as Ed Galbraith. The first episode of the season was dedicated to Forster. Bill Burr was set to return as Patrick Kuby in "Dedicado a Max", but scheduling fell through due to him needing to attend to a personal matter.

=== Filming ===
Filming for the fifth season began on April 10, 2019, in Albuquerque, New Mexico, and ended in September 2019.

In the first scene of the season, Jimmy hides his real identity under his Gene Takavic alias while working at a Cinnabon in a shopping mall in Omaha, Nebraska. The Cinnabon scenes in Better Call Saul are set in Omaha, but are filmed at the Cottonwood Mall in Albuquerque.

Series co-creator Vince Gilligan, who is also the creator of Breaking Bad, said that the episode "Bagman" was the most "challenging" episode he has had to direct so far.

== Episodes ==
Better Call Saul season 5 episodes
No. overall	No. in season	Title	Directed by	Written by	Original release date	U.S. viewers (millions)
41	1	"Magic Man"	Bronwen Hughes	Peter Gould	February 23, 2020	1.60
In a flash-forward, the taxi driver (Jeff) (Note: Seen in the season 4 episode "Smoke".) tells Gene he recognizes him as Saul Goodman. Gene calls Ed, "the Disappearer", but changes his mind and says he will handle the problem himself. In 2004, Jimmy tells Kim the "Saul Goodman" alias he used for his cell phone business (Note: Introduced in the season 4 episode "Something Stupid".) gives him an instant criminal law client base. Nacho reports rumors that cocaine Gus provided the Salamancas is inferior, which Lalo confirms. Gus tells Lalo and Juan Bolsa that Werner was building a chiller on the chicken farm under Mike's supervision but fled with stolen cocaine, which Gus replaced with locally acquired meth. Lalo accepts Gus' apology and cover story but remains suspicious. Gus shuts down lab construction, and Mike sends Werner's crew home. Upset over Gus' lack of compassion for Werner, Mike refuses to accept payment during the downtime. Saul gives away his remaining cell phones to publicize his criminal law practice. Saul's camera crew helps generate publicity for his practice by faking a confrontation with Deputy District Attorney Oakley. When Kim's client refuses a favorable plea bargain, Jimmy offers to help trick him into accepting; Kim refuses, but ends up successfully running the con herself.
42	2	"50% Off"	Norberto Barba	Alison Tatlock	February 24, 2020	1.06
Gus wants Nacho to provide inside information about Lalo's intentions. Two drug users who received Saul's 50% off business card go on a multi-day crime binge. As they attempt to buy more cocaine at the Salamanca drug house, the bags get stuck in the drainpipe. Domingo's attempt to solve the problem causes the drugs to fall out just as the police arrive. Nacho gains Lalo's favor by climbing over rooftops to sneak in and retrieve the drug stash before police enter. Mike remains upset over Werner's death and drinks heavily. He babysits Kaylee, who asks questions about her father, causing Mike to lash out angrily. Jimmy attempts to get back into Kim's good graces. As Saul, Jimmy turns on the charm at the courthouse and makes several favorable plea bargains, then tricks Assistant District Attorney Ericsen into making more after he arranges to be stuck with her in an elevator. Howard invites Jimmy to lunch and the reminder of his past leaves Jimmy unsettled. As Jimmy leaves the courthouse, Nacho suddenly appears and coerces Jimmy into his car.
43	3	"The Guy for This"	Michael Morris	Ann Cherkis	March 2, 2020	1.18
Nacho delivers Jimmy to Lalo, who wants him to make sure Domingo is freed from prison without talking. Jimmy as Saul sets up a ploy that draws in DEA agents Hank Schrader and Steven Gomez. Saul arranges for Domingo to go free in exchange for becoming Hank's confidential informant and revealing the locations of Gus' dead drops. Nacho tries to have someone purchase his father's upholstery shop so he can retire away from the drug world, but his father sees through the ruse. Nacho reveals Lalo's plan for Domingo to Gus, who decides not to interfere because doing so would reveal he has a mole in the Salamanca organization. Mike continues wallowing over Werner's death. Kim is pulled from a day of pro bono criminal defense work to deal with a stubborn homeowner, Mr. Acker, who refuses to leave his land to make way for a Mesa Verde call center. Initially demanding he accept the court judgment, she returns with a sincere offer to help him move, but Acker accuses her of only pretending to help and refuses.
44	4	"Namaste"	Gordon Smith	Gordon Smith	March 9, 2020	1.22
Jimmy meets with Howard over lunch, where Howard offers Jimmy a position at HHM. Jimmy is unnerved by the offer and later uses three bowling balls to damage Howard's expensive car, which sports a vanity plate reading "NAMAST3". Kim tries to convince Mesa Verde to use an alternate development plan and leave Mr. Acker's home standing, but Kevin insists on evicting him. Kim decides to bring in Jimmy as Saul, who represents Acker in a suit against the bank. Gus works with Victor and Diego to ensure that the DEA finds the three dead drops Domingo told them about after his arrest. Stacey tells Mike she does not yet feel comfortable having him babysit Kaylee. That night, Mike is beaten up and stabbed by the local gang he previously fought with, and he wakes in an unknown pueblo.
45	5	"Dedicado a Max"	Jim McKay	Heather Marion	March 16, 2020	1.45
Mike wakes up on a ranch in Mexico which has ties to Gus, including a fountain dedicated to Max. Dr. Barry Goodman treats him and recommends he stay and heal. Gus later arrives and asks for Mike's help in his war against the Salamancas. Mike refuses to engage in killing simply to further Gus' aims, but Gus says he wants Mike because he understands Gus' need for revenge. Jimmy as Saul creates delays in Mesa Verde's eviction of Acker. Kim tries to recuse herself by claiming a conflict of interest, but Kevin insists she remain. Howard asks Jimmy to accept his offer to join HHM, and Jimmy claims he is still considering it. Jimmy suggests there are no options left for Acker but to find "dirt" on Kevin and cautions against it, but she decides to proceed. Jimmy hires Sobchak, who thinks his search of Kevin's home revealed nothing damaging, but Kim's knowing smile as she looks through his photos indicates she notices something useful. Rich Schweikart suggests that Kim disengage from Mesa Verde's business, correctly deducing her heart is not in it, but she angrily refuses.
46	6	"Wexler v. Goodman"	Michael Morris	Thomas Schnauz	March 23, 2020	1.40
Kim tells Jimmy she does not want to follow through on blackmailing Kevin and wants to reach a settlement between Mesa Verde and Everett Acker. Jimmy agrees, but at the meeting to finalize the settlement, he stuns everyone by asking for $4 million. Kim's insight into Sobchak's photos was that Mesa Verde's logo was inspired by a photograph the bank never obtained permission to use. Jimmy pressures Kevin by threatening an injunction against displaying the logo and threatening to run TV ads seeking plaintiffs for class action suits against the bank which negatively depict Kevin's father. Kevin meets privately with Jimmy and accepts a deal to pay Acker and the photographer. Kim angrily confronts Jimmy, upset that he made her the "sucker" for his con. After initially suggesting splitting up, she instead suggests getting married. Gus, Victor, and Mike meet with Nacho, who reports Lalo's plan to reveal the locations of Gus' street dealers to the police. Gus directs Victor to give up low-level employees while ensuring nothing leads back to Gus. Mike secretly points the police to Lalo's involvement in the murder of Fred the money wire clerk, (Note: from "Winner") and they converge on Lalo while he is driving.
47	7	"JMM"	Melissa Bernstein	Alison Tatlock	March 30, 2020	1.30
Jimmy and Kim get married, applying spousal privilege to their conversations. Lalo is charged with murder under an alias and directs Saul to obtain his release on bail. Kim and Rich apologize for the outcome of Acker's case. Kevin indicates he will let them know later whether he will retain them; Kim reminds Kevin he ignored their advice and hopes he will be willing to listen to whomever he hires, and Kevin indicates his approval. Mike tells Stacey he is over the problem that caused his recent anger. Nacho tells Mike that Lalo wants Nacho to burn down one of Gus' restaurants. Gus and other subsidiary owners provide updates to Peter Schuler, Head of Madrigal's fast food division. Gus briefs Peter and Lydia on the meth lab's status. Nacho and Gus destroy a Los Pollos Hermanos location to preserve Nacho's role as Gus' mole. Saul uses Mike's information to accuse police of fabricating evidence against Lalo. Bail is set at $7 million, which Lalo says he can pay. Howard confronts Jimmy and rescinds his job offer. Jimmy blames Howard for Chuck's death and says that as Saul he has grown too big for the constraints of HHM.
48	8	"Bagman"	Vince Gilligan	Gordon Smith	April 6, 2020	1.42
The Cousins pick up Lalo's bail money at a cartel site in Mexico; an informant makes a telephone call to report their presence. Lalo directs Jimmy to a remote pickup site and pays him $100,000 to transport the cash. Kim does not want him to go because he is a lawyer, not a drug dealer's "bagman", but he says it will be an easy job. The Cousins deliver two bags of cash to Jimmy. As Jimmy starts his return trip, he is cut off by several gunmen. They take the money and prepare to kill him but are attacked by an unseen sniper. All but one are killed and the survivor escapes. The shooter is Mike, who drives off with Jimmy and the cash. Jimmy's car breaks down, so they push it over the edge of the road, then walk cross-country to avoid the gunman. They camp overnight, then continue their trek. When Jimmy fails to return, Kim asks Lalo for his location, but he refuses to tell her. The gunman continues searching, so Jimmy acts as a decoy and draws him in. Mike shoots the gunman, whose vehicle flips and is destroyed. Mike and Jimmy resume walking.
49	9	"Bad Choice Road"	Thomas Schnauz	Thomas Schnauz	April 13, 2020	1.51
Tyrus and Victor pick up Jimmy and Mike at a truck stop. Jimmy posts Lalo's bail and claims he walked alone after his car broke down; Lalo plans to return to Mexico. Gus realizes the men who ambushed Jimmy were hired by Juan Bolsa to protect Gus' business. Jimmy lies to Kim about what happened, but she realizes the truth after observing a bullet hole in his coffee mug. Kim quits Schweikart & Cokely. Mike tells Jimmy his post-traumatic stress will pass with time. Lalo goes to the pickup site so the Cousins can transport him to Mexico, but instead searches for Jimmy's car, then returns to Albuquerque. Mike calls to warn Jimmy just before Lalo arrives at Kim's apartment. As Mike trains his rifle on Lalo from a nearby roof, Lalo has Jimmy repeat the story of his desert walk, then asks about the bullet holes in his car. Kim berates Lalo for not trusting Jimmy and Lalo appears satisfied. He tells Nacho to head for Mexico, but not the original pickup site.
50	10	"Something Unforgivable"	Peter Gould	Peter Gould & Ariel Levine	April 20, 2020	1.59
After Lalo leaves, Jimmy tells Kim the truth about his desert trek; Kim and Jimmy hide at a downtown hotel. Mike tells Gus that Lalo and Nacho went to Lalo's Chihuahua home. Gus suggests Nacho can help the assassins he sent. Kim accepts 20 pro bono cases from the public defender. Nacho receives a call telling him to open Lalo's back gate at 3 am. Kim tells Howard she quit Schweikart & Cokely, and he warns her about Jimmy's recent harassment and suggests she stop following his lead. Kim says she is insulted by the notion that she cannot decide for herself. Mike tells Jimmy that Lalo will be killed, and Jimmy later informs Kim. They discuss forcing a Sandpiper case resolution by sabotaging Howard, which would enable Jimmy to receive his seven-figure share of the settlement sooner. Jimmy expresses his unease with Kim's shifting morality, but Kim insists on proceeding. Lalo introduces Nacho to Don Eladio, who blesses Nacho's plans for the Salamanca drug business. At 3 am, Nacho opens Lalo's gate, allowing the assassins entry, then flees. Lalo kills all but one assassin; he forces the survivor to call the middleman who arranged the attempt and report that Lalo was killed.

== Release ==
=== Broadcast ===
In the United States, the season debuted with a two-night premiere on Sunday, February 23, 2020, and Monday, February 24, where it returned to its regular timeslot. In the weeks prior to the premiere, AMC had aired a Breaking Bad marathon leading into the AMC premiere showing of El Camino: A Breaking Bad Movie as lead-in to Better Call Saul's fifth season. Regarding the decision to air the fifth season nearly a year and a half after the fourth, Sarah Barnett, the president of the entertainment networks group at AMC Networks, said the long hiatus was "driven by talent needs, which we would not override if it would result in a worse show".

In certain international markets, like previous seasons, the fifth season was released on Netflix with episodes available the day after the episodes were broadcast on AMC.

=== Home media ===
The fifth season was released on Blu-ray and DVD in region 1 on November 24, 2020. The set contains all 10 episodes, plus cast and crew audio commentaries on every episode, deleted scenes, and various behind-the-scenes featurettes.

== Reception ==
=== Critical response ===
The fifth season of Better Call Saul was widely praised by television critics. On Rotten Tomatoes, the season has an approval rating of 99% based on 185 reviews, with an average rating of 8.9/10. The website's critical consensus reads, "Grounded by Bob Odenkirk's endlessly nuanced, lived-in performance, Better Call Saul's fifth season is a darkly funny, vividly realized master class in tragedy." On Metacritic, the season has a score of 92 out of 100 based on 16 critics.

Kelly Connolly of TV Guide gave it four and a half out of five, and wrote that Better Call Saul is better than other prequels, saying that the series "understands that the tragedy of fate is baked into the story". Writing for Collider, Adam Chitwood gave it a perfect five out of five review, stating that the series might have become even better than Breaking Bad, and describing its execution as "unparalleled by anything on television right now". Daniel D'Addario of Variety gave the first few episodes a positive review, saying "Better Call Saul, in the early going of its fifth and penultimate season, remains the picture of white-knuckled but real restraint." Jen Chaney of Vulture said that Kim's development into a similar character as Jimmy made viewing the fifth season a more "nerve-wracking experience than usual, in the best, albeit still anxiety-provoking way."

The final few episodes were highlighted by Alison Herman from The Ringer, as she mentioned that they finally had the two stories of Better Call Saul, Jimmy's story involving legal work, and Mike's story involving the drug cartel, fully intersect after several seasons to a great effect. The episode "Bagman" received praise from critics and audiences, with some considering it to be the series's best episode. The following episode "Bad Choice Road" received similar acclaim.

Rhea Seehorn's performance as Kim during the season was seen by some critics as its stand-out performance. Both from Rolling Stone, Alan Sepinwall described her as the "MVP of Better Call Saul", and Brian Tallerico referred to Seehorn's work as "one of the best performances on any show in the last decade". Liz Shannon Miller of Collider wrote in regards to her Emmy snub, "Seehorn in particular hurts after turning in career-best work; Kim Wexler's journey in Season 5 was a heartbreaking, even chilling experience". The final scene from "Bad Choice Road" in which Kim stands up to Lalo for Jimmy was highlighted by CNN's Brian Lowry, saying that it has "really been Seehorn's year, crystallizing what has drawn Kim to Jimmy" and that it showed the "character's strength". TVLine named Seehorn their "Performer of the Week" for her performance in "Bad Choice Road", particularity the final scene. They wrote that Seehorn was "delivering one of the best performances on TV" and "is the best thing that ever happened to Better Call Saul".

==== Critics' top ten list ====
2020
- No. 1 Adweek
- No. 1 Collider
- No. 1 Entertainment Weekly (Kirsten Baldwin and Darren Franich)
- No. 1 The Playlist
- No. 1 Rolling Stone
- No. 2 Complex
- No. 2 Consequence
- No. 2 Den of Geek
- No. 2 NPR (Fresh Air)
- No. 2 The Ringer
- No. 2 Salon.com
- No. 2 Thrillist
- No. 2 Time
- No. 2 TVLine
- No. 3 The Hollywood Reporter (Daniel Fienberg)
- No. 3 Slant
- No. 3 Uproxx
- No. 4 ScreenCrush
- No. 5 Primetimer
- No. 6 IndieWire
- No. 8 Empire
- No. 8 Film School Rejects
- No. 8 Polygon
- No. 8 Vanity Fair
- No. 8 Vulture (Matt Zoller Seitz)
- No. 9 RogerEbert.com
- No. 10 Decider
- – The Economist
- – The New York Times (James Poniewozik)

=== Ratings ===
Viewership and ratings per episode of Better Call Saul season 5
No.	Title	Air date	Rating (18–49)	Viewers (millions)	DVR (18–49)	DVR viewers (millions)	Total (18–49)	Total viewers (millions)
1	"Magic Man"	February 23, 2020	0.5	1.60	0.5	1.69	1.0	3.29
2	"50% Off"	February 24, 2020	0.3	1.06	0.3	1.29	0.6	2.34
3	"The Guy for This"	March 2, 2020	0.3	1.18	0.4	1.45	0.7	2.63
4	"Namaste"	March 9, 2020	0.3	1.22	0.4	1.49	0.8	2.71
5	"Dedicado a Max"	March 16, 2020	0.4	1.45	0.5	1.55	0.9	3.00
6	"Wexler v. Goodman"	March 23, 2020	0.3	1.40	0.5	1.67	0.9	3.07
7	"JMM"	March 30, 2020	0.3	1.30	0.5	1.54	0.8	2.84
8	"Bagman"	April 6, 2020	0.3	1.42	0.4	1.34	0.7	2.76
9	"Bad Choice Road"	April 13, 2020	0.4	1.51	0.4	1.39	0.8	2.90
10	"Something Unforgivable"	April 20, 2020	0.4	1.59	0.4	1.44	0.8	3.03

== Accolades ==
Ceremony	Category	Recipients	Result	Ref.
36th TCA Awards	Program of the Year	Better Call Saul	Nominated	
36th TCA Awards	Outstanding Achievement in Drama	Better Call Saul	Nominated	
36th TCA Awards	Individual Achievement in Drama	Rhea Seehorn	Nominated	
72nd Primetime Emmy Awards	Outstanding Drama Series	Better Call Saul	Nominated	
72nd Primetime Emmy Awards	Outstanding Supporting Actor in a Drama Series	Giancarlo Esposito	Nominated	
72nd Primetime Emmy Awards	Outstanding Writing for a Drama Series	Thomas Schnauz ("Bad Choice Road")	Nominated	
72nd Primetime Emmy Awards	Outstanding Writing for a Drama Series	Gordon Smith ("Bagman")	Nominated	
72nd Primetime Creative Arts Emmy Awards	Outstanding Music Supervision	Thomas Golubić ("The Guy for This")	Nominated	
72nd Primetime Creative Arts Emmy Awards	Outstanding Sound Editing for a Comedy or Drama Series (One Hour)	Nick Forshager, Kathryn Madsen, Matt Temple, Todd Toon, Jeff Cranford, Jane Boegel-Koch, Jason Tregoe Newman, Gregg Barbanell, Alex Ullrich ("Bagman")	Nominated	
72nd Primetime Creative Arts Emmy Awards	Outstanding Sound Mixing for a Comedy or Drama Series (One Hour)	Phillip W. Palmer, Larry Benjamin, Kevin Valentine ("Bagman")	Nominated	
72nd Primetime Creative Arts Emmy Awards	Outstanding Short Form Comedy or Drama Series	Employee Training: Legal Ethics with Kim Wexler	Won	
25th Satellite Awards	Best Drama Series	Better Call Saul	Won	
25th Satellite Awards	Best Actor in a Drama/Genre Series	Bob Odenkirk	Won	
11th Critics' Choice Television Awards	Best Drama Series	Better Call Saul	Nominated	
11th Critics' Choice Television Awards	Best Actor in a Drama Series	Bob Odenkirk	Nominated	
11th Critics' Choice Television Awards	Best Supporting Actor in a Drama Series	Jonathan Banks	Nominated	
11th Critics' Choice Television Awards	Best Supporting Actress in a Drama Series	Rhea Seehorn	Nominated	
11th Critics' Choice Television Awards	Best Short Form Series	Employee Training: Legal Ethics with Kim Wexler	Won	
78th Golden Globe Awards	Best Actor – Television Series Drama	Bob Odenkirk	Nominated	
73rd Writers Guild of America Awards	Best Drama Series	Ann Cherkis, Vince Gilligan, Peter Gould, Ariel Levine, Heather Marion, Thomas Schnauz, Gordon Smith, Alison Tatlock	Nominated	
73rd Writers Guild of America Awards	Best Episodic Drama	Thomas Schnauz ("Bad Choice Road")	Nominated	
73rd Writers Guild of America Awards	Best Episodic Drama	Alison Tatlock ("JMM")	Nominated	
73rd Writers Guild of America Awards	Best Episodic Drama	Peter Gould and Ariel Levine ("Something Unforgivable")	Nominated	
73rd Writers Guild of America Awards	Original and Adapted Short Form New Media	Employee Training: Legal Ethics with Kim Wexler	Nominated	
27th Screen Actors Guild Awards	Outstanding Performance by an Ensemble in a Drama Series	Better Call Saul	Nominated	
27th Screen Actors Guild Awards	Outstanding Performance by a Male Actor in a Drama Series	Bob Odenkirk	Nominated	
32nd Producers Guild of America Awards	Best Episodic Drama	Better Call Saul	Nominated	
32nd Producers Guild of America Awards	Outstanding Short-Form Program	Employee Training: Legal Ethics with Kim Wexler	Nominated	
73rd Directors Guild of America Awards	Outstanding Directing – Drama Series	Vince Gilligan ("Bagman)"	Nominated	
46th Saturn Awards	Best Action-Thriller Television Series	Better Call Saul	Won	
46th Saturn Awards	Best Actor on Television	Bob Odenkirk	Nominated	
46th Saturn Awards	Best Actress on Television	Rhea Seehorn	Nominated	
46th Saturn Awards	Best Supporting Actor on Television	Jonathan Banks	Nominated	
46th Saturn Awards	Best Supporting Actor on Television	Tony Dalton	Nominated	

In response to the Emmy nominations, several critics felt that Odenkirk (who had been nominated for each previous season) and Seehorn were significant snubs.

== Related media ==
=== Ethics Training with Kim Wexler ===
AMC released ten mini-episodes of Ethics Training with Kim Wexler alongside the fifth season of Better Call Saul, which were presented on both YouTube and AMC's social media sites. It follows similar series Los Pollos Hermanos Employee Training w/ Gus Fring for season three and Madrigal Electromotive Security Training presented by Mike Ehrmantraut for the fourth season. The ethics training videos are presented as continuing education videos mixing live-action segments of Kim with Jimmy filming her behind the scenes along with animated segments, and are a product of "Saul Goodman Productions". The animated segments include nods to both Better Call Saul and Breaking Bad. The web series won the award for Outstanding Short Form Comedy or Drama Series at the 72nd Primetime Creative Arts Emmy Awards.
