= Steven Michael Quezada =

American comedian, actor and politician

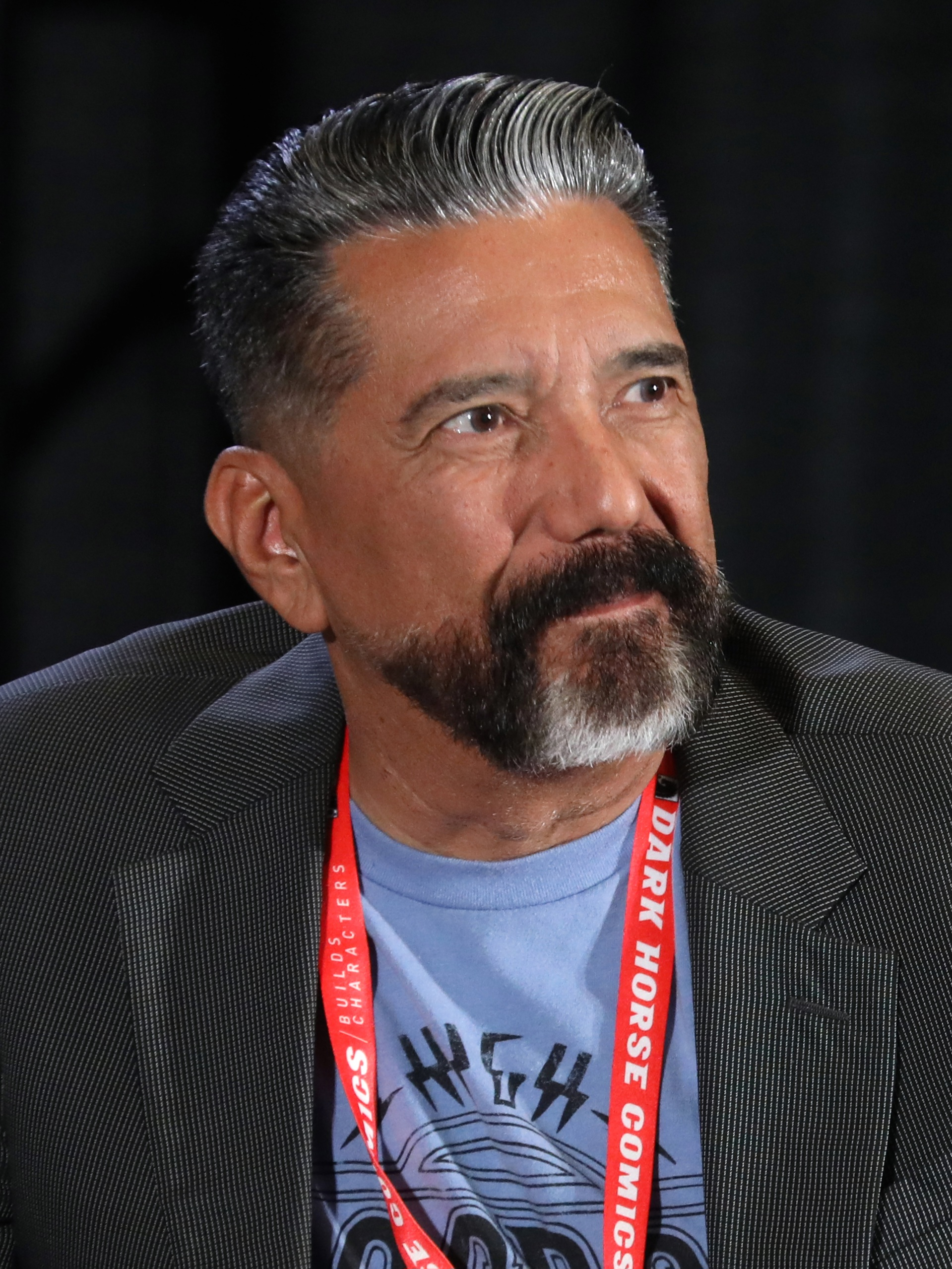
- Quezada in 2024

Chair of the Bernalillo County Board of Commissioners
- In office January 9, 2018 – January 7, 2019
- Preceded by: Debbie O'Malley
- Succeeded by: Maggie Hart Stebbins

Vice Chair of the Bernalillo County Board of Commissioners
- In office January 12, 2021 – January 10, 2022
- Preceded by: Charlene Pyskoty
- Succeeded by: Walt Benson
- In office January 10, 2017 – January 8, 2018
- Preceded by: Wayne Johnson
- Succeeded by: Lonnie Talbert

Member of the Bernalillo County Board of Commissioners
- In office January 10, 2017 – January 1, 2025
- Preceded by: Art De La Cruz
- Succeeded by: Frank Baca
- Constituency: District 2

Personal details
- Born: February 15, 1963 (age 63) Albuquerque, New Mexico, U.S.
- Party: Democratic
- Spouse: Cherise Desiree Quezada (m. 2007)
- Children: 4
- Education: Eastern New Mexico University (attended)
- Occupation: Actor, politician

Steven Michael Quezada (/kəˈsɑːdə/; born February 15, 1963) is an American actor, comedian and politician. He played Drug Enforcement Administration (DEA) agent Steven Gómez, the level-headed partner of Hank Schrader, in the AMC series Breaking Bad from 2008 to 2013 and reprised his role in its spin-off, Better Call Saul during season 5. As a touring comedian Quezada has headlined at The Laugh Factory and George Lopez's Punchliner Comedy Club for Carnival Cruise Line, he has a 2022 comedy special on Amazon Prime titled The New Mexican and, in December 2023, he opened Quezada's Comedy Club and Cantina in Santa Ana Star Casino.

From 2017 to 2025, he served on the Bernalillo County Board of Commissioners.

== Early life and education ==
Quezada was born in Albuquerque, New Mexico. He graduated from West Mesa High School in 1981. After graduating from high school, Quezada attended Eastern New Mexico University where he studied theatre arts, but did not earn a degree.

== Career ==
Besides his role in Breaking Bad, he has appeared in films such as First Snow (2006), Beerfest (2006), and Kites (2010). He hosted the talk show The After After Party in Albuquerque from 2010 to 2012. Quezada portrays a priest presiding over a roadside funeral in country singer Eric Church's music video for the single Give Me Back My Hometown (2014).

On February 4, 2013, he was elected to the Albuquerque school board; He ran unopposed for the District 2 seat on the city's west side. In 2016, Quezada ran for and won the Democratic nomination for New Mexico's Bernalillo County Board of Commissioners for District 2. In a three-way race, Quezada won with 36 percent of the vote. He defeated Republican Patricia Paiz in the general election and was sworn in for a four-year term. He was re-elected in 2020 with no general election opposition.

== Electoral history ==
=== 2016 ===
Bernalillo County Board of Commissioners District 2 Democratic Primary, 2016
Primary election
Party	Candidate	Votes	%
Democratic	Steven Quezada	3,849	36
Democratic	Adrian A Pedroza	3,511	32
Democratic	Robert G Chavez	3,456	32
Total votes		10,816	100.00

Bernalillo County Board of Commissioners District 2 Election, 2016
Party	Candidate	Votes	%	±%
Democratic	Steven Quezada	20,847	62.04	
Republican	Patricia Paiz	12,755	37.96	
Total votes		33,602	100.0	
Democratic hold				

=== 2020 ===
Bernalillo County Board of Commissioners District 2 Democratic Primary, 2020
Primary election
Party	Candidate	Votes	%
Democratic	Steven Quezada	6,635	56.5
Democratic	Frank Baca	5,104	43.5
Total votes		11,739	100.00

Bernalillo County Board of Commissioners District 2 Election, 2020
Party	Candidate	Votes	%	±%
Democratic	Steven Quezada	28,678	100	

== Filmography ==
=== Film ===
Year	Title	Role	Notes
2005	Three Wise Guys	Rental Agent	Television film
2006	Beerfest	Mexican	
2006	First Snow	Mechanic Enrique	
2008	Milagros	Leon	
2010	Love Ranch	First Drunk	
2010	Kites	Cop	Uncredited
2011	The Reunion	Col.Ramirez	
2011	Surreal Estate	Bearded Man	
2011	Warrior Woman	Miguel	
2012	Powder Pigs	Mr. Valdez	
2013	Supernal Darkness	Victor	
2013	The Rambler	Guard #2	
2015	Spare Parts	Military Clerk	
2015	La Vida Robot	Salgado	
2015	The Condemned 2	Raul Baccaro	
2016	Fender Bender	Mario	
2016	The Last Transmission	Val	Short
2016	Outlaws and Angels	Alonzo	
2017	Girlfriend's Day	Munoz	
2019	3 from Hell	Diego	
2019	Wish Man	Juan Delgadillo	
2023	Strange Darling	Pete	
2024	Harsh Treatment	Hicks Pilford	

=== Television ===
Year	Title	Role	Notes
2006	Wildfire	Ernie Kent	Episode: "Fear"
2008	In Plain Sight	Luis Cruz	Episode: "Hoosier Daddy"
2008–2013	Breaking Bad	Steven Gómez	Recurring; 33 episodes
2009	Crash	Councilman Rizzario	Episode: "You Set the Scene"
2015	Documentary Now!	El Chingon	Episode: "DRONEZ: The Hunt for El Chingon"
2015	Almost American	Jesus Quezman	Episode: "Teacher's Choice"
2015	Foreseeable	Gabriel Flores	Television film
2020	Roswell, New Mexico	Dean of Surgery	Episode: "What If God Was One of Us?"
2020	Better Call Saul	Steven Gómez	Episodes: "The Guy for This", "Namaste"
2021	Magnum P.I.	Uncle Bernardo	Episode: "Before the Fall"

=== Music videos ===
Year	Artist	Title	Role
2014	Eric Church	"Give Me Back My Hometown"	Priest at roadside funeral
