= The Guy for This =

- Better Call Saul episode
- Promotional poster
- Episode no.: Season 5 Episode 3
- Directed by: Michael Morris
- Written by: Ann Cherkis
- Original air date: March 2, 2020
- Running time: 54 minutes

Guest appearances
- Max Arciniega as Domingo Molina; Ray Campbell as Tyrus Kitt; Dennis Boutsikaris as Rich Schweikart; Cara Pifko as Paige Novick; Barry Corbin as Everett Acker; Juan Carlos Cantu as Manuel Varga; KeiLyn Durrel Jones as Blingy; Katerina Tannenbaum as Amber; Poppy Liu as Jo; Dean Norris as Hank Schrader; Steven Michael Quezada as Steven Gomez

Episode chronology
← Previous "50% Off"	Next → "Namaste"
- Better Call Saul season 5

"The Guy for This" is the third episode of the fifth season of the AMC television series Better Call Saul, a spin-off series of Breaking Bad. The episode aired on March 2, 2020, on AMC in the United States. Outside of the United States, the episode premiered on the streaming service Netflix in several countries.

The episode centers on Jimmy McGill (Bob Odenkirk) being forced to use his fast-talking "Saul Goodman" legal personality to arrange for the release of Domingo Molina (Max Arciniega) from prison at the request of Lalo Salamanca (Tony Dalton), while Kim Wexler (Rhea Seehorn) is pulled off her pro bono public defense work to deal with a stubborn client for the Mesa Verde bank. The episode features the guest appearance of Breaking Bad star Dean Norris reprising his role as Drug Enforcement Administration (DEA) agent Hank Schrader, along with Steven Michael Quezada as Hank's partner Steven Gomez. Showrunner Peter Gould brought the character of Hank back to help drive the transformation of Jimmy into Saul.

== Plot ==
Nacho Varga takes Jimmy McGill to Lalo Salamanca, who knows of Jimmy's reputation from his cousin, Tuco Salamanca. (Note: As shown in the episode "Mijo") Lalo wants Jimmy to feed Domingo Molina a specific story to follow while serving as his lawyer. Jimmy is reluctant and quotes Lalo an exorbitant fee, but is surprised when Lalo readily pays cash in advance.

Mike Ehrmantraut gets drunk at the bar he once visited with Werner Ziegler. (Note: As shown in the episode "Coushatta") On his way home, a gang of thugs attempt to rob him, but he breaks the leader's arm and calmly walks off. Nacho's father Manuel reveals that someone has offered to buy his upholstery shop for more than it is worth. Manuel accuses Nacho of arranging the deal, refuses to accept, and says he will not flee. He tells Nacho that if he is in trouble, then he should decide for himself whether to run or turn himself in to the police.

Jimmy meets with Domingo in jail and explains Lalo's plan. When Drug Enforcement Administration (DEA) agents Hank Schrader and Steven Gomez arrive, Jimmy steps in as Domingo's lawyer "Saul Goodman" and arranges for Domingo to be released as an informant in exchange for providing the DEA with details of Gus Fring's dead drops. Jimmy reports to Lalo, who is pleased, while Nacho warns Jimmy that once he begins working for drug dealers, there is no turning back. Nacho reports Domingo's release to Gus and explains Lalo's plan for the dead drops. Gus decides to maintain the drops, because doing otherwise would reveal to Lalo that someone is providing inside information about the Salamancas.

Kim Wexler has a full day of pro bono cases, but Rich Schweikart demands she take care of pressing Mesa Verde business. A Tucumcari homeowner, Everett Acker, is refusing to leave property leased from the bank so that the bank can construct a new call center. Acker refuses a compromise and Kim angrily tells him he has no choice. Paige Novick is happy with Kim's tough approach, but Kim is troubled. On her way home, she turns around and returns to Tucumcari. She approaches Acker sympathetically, tries to convince him to move, and offers to help. Acker rejects her attempts and tells her she will say whatever is necessary to get what she wants. Kim vents her frustrations by throwing beer bottles from her balcony with Jimmy.

== Production ==
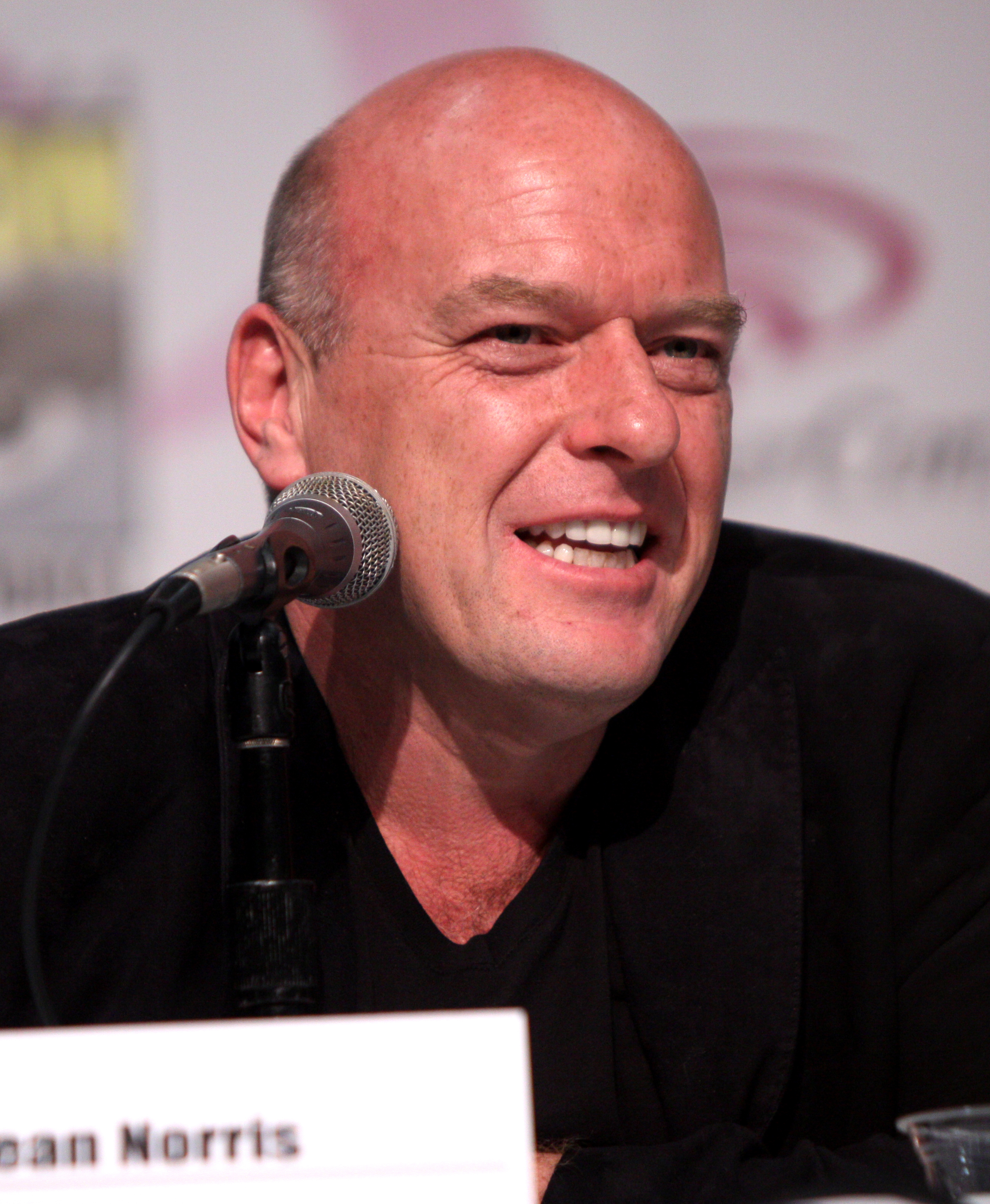
Dean Norris reprises his Breaking Bad role of Hank Schrader.

This episode features the appearance of Dean Norris reprising his starring role on Breaking Bad as DEA agent Hank Schrader, along with Steven Michael Quezada reprising Hank's partner Steven Gomez; Norris is the first of the leading cast credited through the entirety of Breaking Bad's run to appear on Better Call Saul. (Note: While Bob Odenkirk, Giancarlo Esposito and Jonathan Banks were all main cast in Breaking Bad, they were not credited as such until the third season.) When Better Call Saul was first in development, Norris had been unavailable due to starring in Under the Dome but expressed interest in returning. Norris said that he and showrunner Peter Gould had spoken many times before bringing Hank back for Better Call Saul, though Norris said to Gould, "Just don't let it be a gratuitous return, just to say he's in it." Norris said that Gould wanted to have Hank come back to have some part in the transformation of Jimmy McGill into Saul Goodman so that Hank's appearance was not gratuitous. Gould himself spoke of the need to have "some very smart law enforcement people who are worthy opponents" for Jimmy that would push him into using the Saul Goodman persona even deeper without necessarily recognizing the full consequences of those actions, and thus where it made sense to bring in Norris to play Hank. Norris found it easy to fall back into character, particularly as the version of Hank prior to his post-traumatic stress disorder from killing Tuco in "Grilled", as well as acting alongside Quezada, whom he has remained friends with since their Breaking Bad days.

The show opens and closes on scenes involving a mass of ants swarming over an ice cream cone that Jimmy dropped when he was picked up by Nacho in "50% Off". The shots were made with about two thousand live red harvester ants, collected from and returned to the wild by animal trainer Jules Sylvester. They used an ice cream-like substance that would not be toxic to the ants but still draw them to swarm across it as to get the shots they wanted.

== Reception ==
"The Guy for This" received critical acclaim. On Rotten Tomatoes, it garnered a perfect 100% rating with an average score of 8.3/10 based on 14 reviews. The site's critical consensus is, "Better Call Saul gifts viewers with a welcome hunk of Hank Schrader in an otherwise ominous chapter that illustrates how the forces of darkness are enclosing around Jimmy and Kim like ants on an ice cream."

For his work on this episode, Thomas Golubić was nominated for Outstanding Music Supervision at the 72nd Primetime Creative Arts Emmy Awards.

=== Ratings ===
"The Guy for This" was watched by 1.18 million viewers on its first broadcast, which was a slight increase from the previous week of 1.06 million.
