= Dean Norris =

American actor (born 1963)

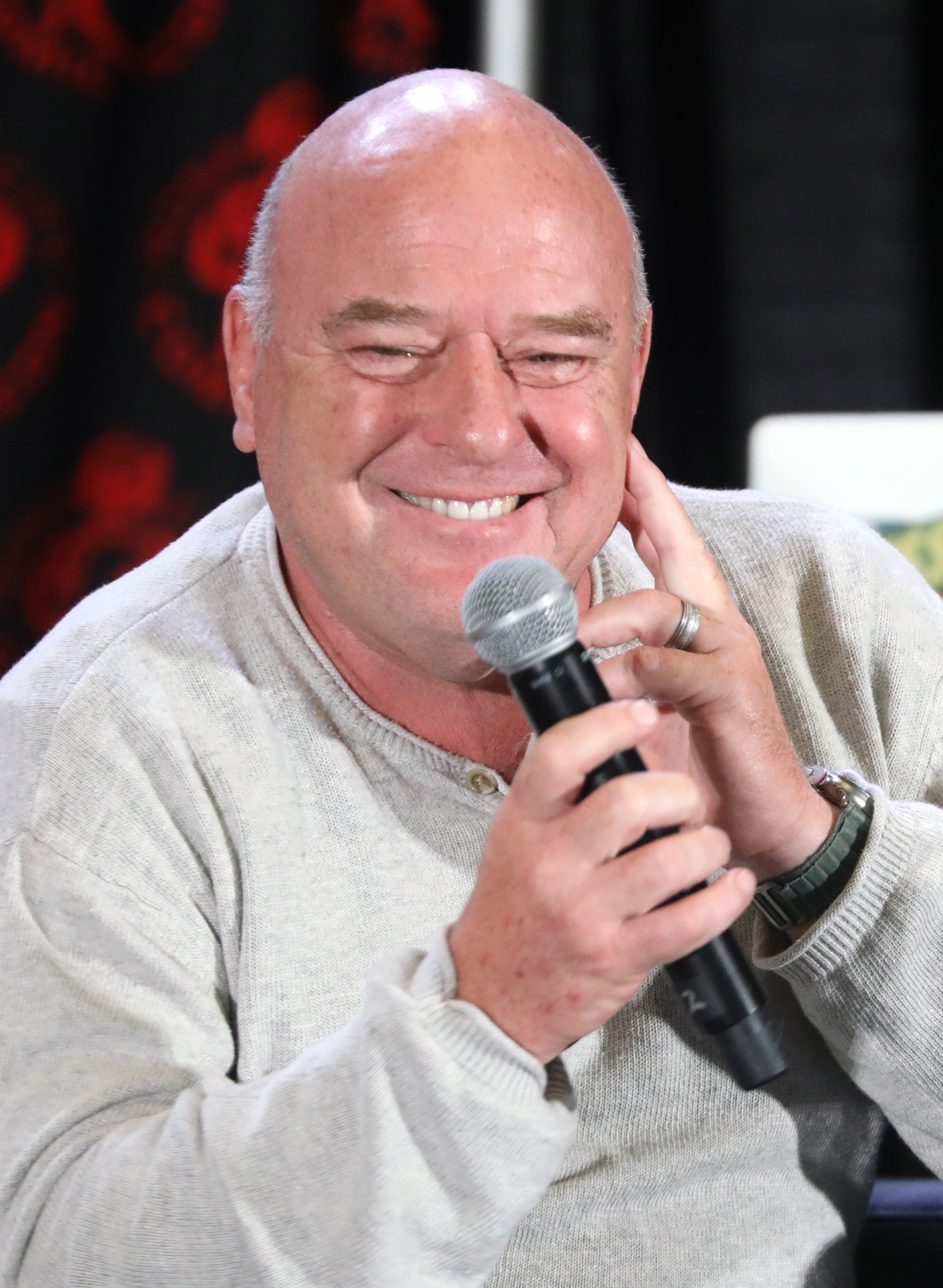
- Norris at the 2024 Rose City Comic Con
- Born: Dean Joseph Norris; April 8, 1963 (age 63); South Bend, Indiana, U.S.
- Education: Harvard University (AB); Royal Academy of Dramatic Art (GrDip)
- Occupation: Actor
- Years active: 1981–present
- Spouse: Bridget Norris (m. 2001; sep. 2025)
- Children: 5

Dean Joseph Norris (born April 8, 1963) is an American actor. He is best known for playing Hank Schrader on the AMC series Breaking Bad (2008–2013). Throughout his career, he has amassed over 154 credits across film and television, including over 40 law enforcement roles.

Early in his film career, he collaborated with director Paul Verhoeven on Total Recall (1990) and Starship Troopers (1997). After the success of Breaking Bad, he was cast in more prominent film roles in titles such as The Counselor (2013), Remember (2015), Scary Stories to Tell in the Dark (2019), and Carry-On (2024). Other series regular roles on television include Under the Dome (2013–2015) and Claws (2017–2022).

== Early life and education ==
Dean Joseph Norris was born on April 8, 1963, in South Bend, Indiana, to a family of Hungarian descent; his grandfather lived in Tiszadob. He graduated from Clay High School in 1981, where he was the class valedictorian. While in high school, he was a member of the award-winning student-produced comedy show Beyond Our Control, which ran on WNDU-TV. He is a 1985 graduate of Harvard College, where he was a first-generation college student who studied the interdisciplinary concentration of Social Studies and was a member of Hasty Pudding Theatricals. He also earned a diploma from the Royal Academy of Dramatic Art in 1987.

== Career ==
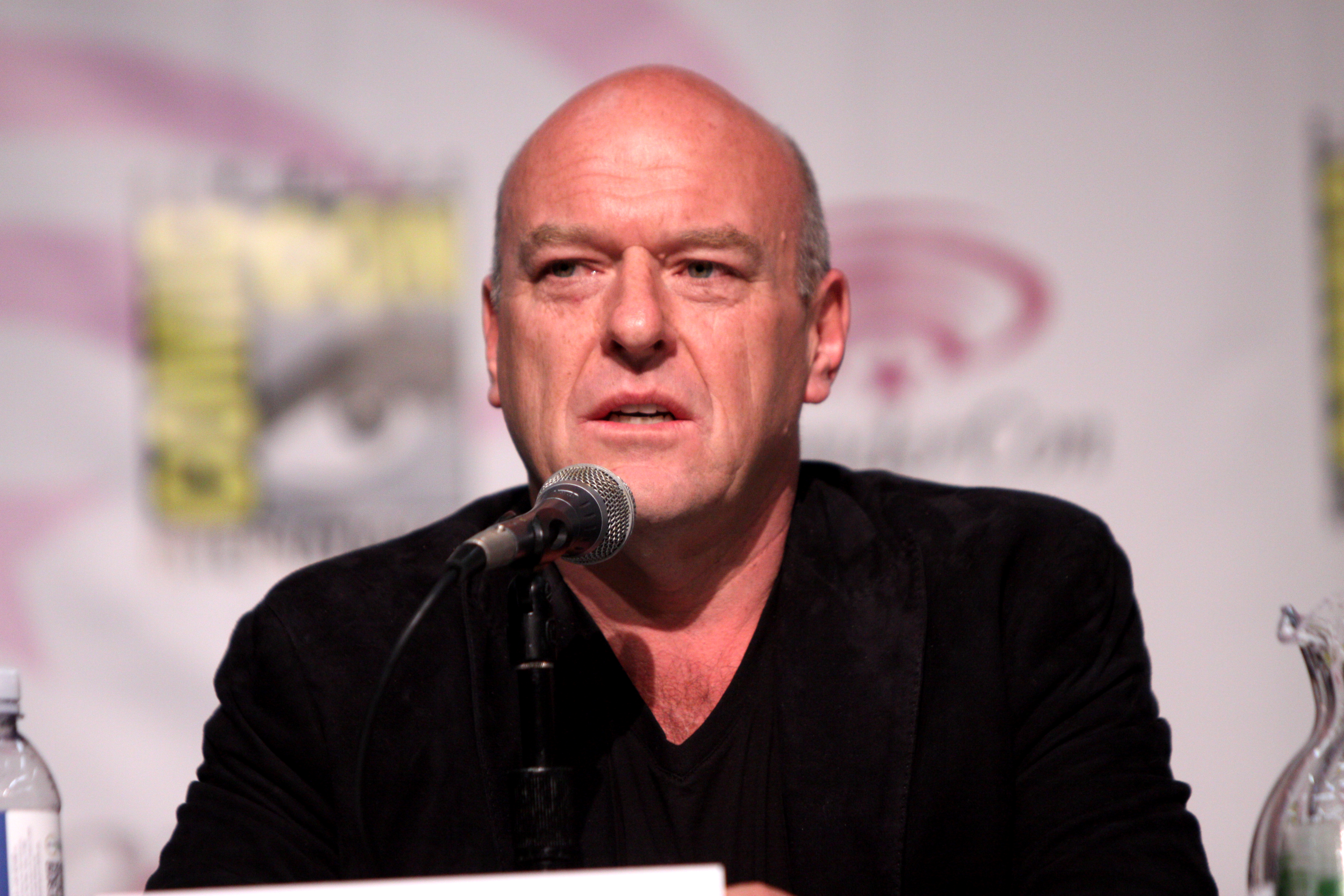
Norris in 2013

=== Television ===
Norris starred in Tremors: The Series and the film Without Limits. He has had guest spots in other television series including NYPD Blue, The X-Files, The West Wing, and Lost.

He played Drug Enforcement Administration (DEA) agent Hank Schrader on Breaking Bad from the show's premiere in 2008 to its final season in 2013. Norris's performance on Breaking Bad has received critical acclaim.

Norris also starred in the CBS series Under the Dome. He plays selectman James "Big Jim" Rennie, the primary antagonist.

As of June 2017, he plays mob boss Clay "Uncle Daddy" Husser in the TNT series Claws.

In 2020, Norris reprised the role of Agent Hank Schrader on-screen in the Breaking Bad prequel Better Call Saul during the show's fifth season.

Norris was cast in a lead role for the CBS sitcom United States of Al.

=== Film ===
Norris has appeared in films such as Lethal Weapon 2 (1989), Hard to Kill (1990), Total Recall (1990), Terminator 2: Judgment Day (1991), The Firm (1993), Starship Troopers (1997), The Cell (2000), Little Miss Sunshine (2006), Evan Almighty (2007), Sons of Liberty (2015), The Book of Henry (2017), Death Wish (2018), Scary Stories to Tell in the Dark (2019) and Carry-On (2024).

== Personal life ==
Norris and his wife, Bridget, a former entertainment attorney, have five children together. The couple lives in Temecula, California. In 2018, the couple opened the Norris Performing Arts Center in Murrieta. Norris is a fan of his hometown team the Notre Dame Fighting Irish. In 2019, he helped launch Schraderbräu, Hank Schrader's in-universe home-brewed craft beer, as an official product. In 2022, the couple purchased The Swing Inn Cafe, a long-standing restaurant in Old Town, Temecula, for $6 million.

Norris is a member of the Democratic Party. He attended the 2016 and 2024 Democratic National Conventions.

Bridget filed for divorce from Norris on February 14, 2025.

== Filmography ==
=== Film ===
Year	Title	Role
1985	Blind Alleys	Peter Brockway
1989	Police Academy 6: City Under Siege	Cop
1989	Disorganized Crime	Deputy Joe
1989	Lethal Weapon 2	Detective Tim Cavanaugh
1990	Montana	Foreman
1990	When You Remember Me	Bill
1990	Hard to Kill	Sergeant Goodhart
1990	Total Recall	Tony
1990	Gremlins 2: The New Batch	SWAT Team Leader
1990	Desperate Hours	Maddox
1991	Terminator 2: Judgment Day	SWAT Team Leader
1992	The Lawnmower Man	The Director
1993	The Firm	Squat Man
1993	Full Eclipse	Fleming
1993	Jailbait	Hershiser
1994	Playmaker	Detective Marconi
1994	The Last Seduction	Shep
1995	Safe	Mover
1995	Money Train	Guard
1997	Gattaca	Beat Cop
1997	Starship Troopers	Commanding Officer
1998	The Negotiator	Scott
1998	Without Limits	Dellinger
1999	Sonic Impact	Agent McGee
2000	3 Strikes	Officer Robert
2000	The Cell	Cole
2001	The One	Sergeant Siegel
2005	American Gun	Terrence
2006	Little Miss Sunshine	State Trooper McCleary
2007	Evan Almighty	Officer Collins
2007	The Heartbreak Kid	Jodi's Father
2008	Linewatch	Warren Kane
2010	How Do You Know	Tom
2011	Prom	Frank Prescott
2012	Get the Gringo	Officer Bill
2013	The Frozen Ground	Sergeant Lyle Haugsven
2013	The Counselor	The Buyer
2014	Small Time	Ash Martini
2014	Men, Women & Children	Kent Mooney
2015	Remember	John Kurlander
2015	Secret in Their Eyes	'Bumpy' Willis
2017	Fist Fight	Principal Richard Tyler
2017	The Book of Henry	Commissioner Glenn Sickleman
2018	Beirut	Donald Gaines
2018	Death Wish	Detective Kevin Raines
2019	The Hustle	Howard Bacon
2019	Scary Stories to Tell in the Dark	Roy Nicholls
2023	Fool's Paradise	Studio Head
2024	Unfrosted	Nikita Khrushchev
2024	The Six Triple Eight	General Halt
2024	Carry-On	Phil Sarkowski
2025	The Parenting	John
2025	Border Hunters	Abraham
2026	Long Haired Businessmen	Unnamed Businessman
2026	Confession	Boris

=== Television ===
Year	Title	Role	Notes
1981	Beyond Our Control	Company Member	13 episodes
1987	The Equalizer	Martin	Episode: "Christmas Presence"
1988	Leap of Faith	Richard	Television film
1988	Police Story: Gladiator School	Ralph Thomas	Television film
1989	Beauty and the Beast	Biggs	Episode: "A Kingdom by the Sea"
1990	Montana	Foreman	Television film
1991	Murderous Vision	Lieutenant Martin	Television film
1991	Locked Up: A Mother's Rage	Mike	Television film
1992	Till Death Us Do Part	Matt Hobert	Television film
1992	Secrets	Henderson	Television film
1992	Homefront	Second Coworker	Episode: "Take My Hand"
1993	Barbarians at the Gate	Scientist	Television film
1993–1994	NYPD Blue	Father Jerry Downey	3 episodes
1994	Married... with Children	Rodent	Episode: "Dud Bowl"
1994	Lakota Woman: Siege at Wounded Knee	Red Arrow	Television film
1995	The X-Files	Marshal Tapia	Episode: "F. Emasculata"
1995	Fallen Angels	Allen	Episode: "Tomorrow I Die"
1995	The Marshal	Tyler Dumas	Episode: "Kissing Cousins"
1995	In the Line of Duty: Hunt for Justice	Levasseur	Television film
1995	Texas Justice	Luke Wheeler	Television film
1995–1996	Murder One	Rusty Arnold	3 episodes
1996	Dark Skies	Clayton Lewis	Episode: "We Shall Overcome"
1996	Innocent Victims	Frank Sarezin	Television film
1996	It Came from Outer Space II	Dave Grant	Television film
1996	Seduced by Madness	Detective Pike	Television film
1996	Forgotten Sins	Detective Carl Messenger	Television film
1996	Death Benefit	Rod Montgomery	Television film
1996	After Jimmy	Ray Johnson	Television film
1997	Riot	Kalena	Television film
1997	On the Line	Manny Denikolas	Television film
1997	The Pretender	Tommy Larson	Episode: "Prison Story
1997	Nash Bridges	William Robard	Episode: "Deliverance"
1998	V.I.P.	Jackson LaSarr	Episode: "Beats Working at a Hot Dog Stand"
1998	ER	Clark	Episode: "They Treat Horses, Don't They?"
1998	Walker, Texas Ranger	Deke Powell	Episode: "War Cry"
1999	Millennium	Del Boxer	Episode: "Seven and One"
1999	Pensacola: Wings of Gold	'Spider' / Colonel Laweson	3 episodes
1999	The Practice	Detective	Episode: "Free Dental"
1999	Charmed	Dr. Stone	Episode: "They're Everywhere"
1999	Nash Bridges	Frank Maddigan	Episode: "Smash and Grab"
2000	The Pretender	Sheriff Whalen	Episode: "Corn Man"
2001	Boston Public	Matthew Gordon	Episode: "Chapter Sixteen"
2001	Six Feet Under	Detective Shea	Episode: "Familia"
2001	The District	Charles N. Burke	Episode: "Bulldog's Ghost"
2002	JAG	Jury member	Episode: "Odd Man Out"
2002	Philly	Detective Duff	Episode: "Mojo Rising"
2002–2004	American Dreams	Frank Moran	2 episodes
2003	24	General Bowden	2 episodes
2003	Tremors	Agent W.D. Twitchell	Main role, 10 episodes
2003	Dragnet	Leon Tate	Episode: "Slice of Life"
2004, 2011	CSI: Crime Scene Investigation	Bob Durham Jr. / Phil Baker	4 episodes
2004	NCIS	Gunnery Sergeant Vesta	Episode: "My Other Left Foot"
2004	Crossing Jordan	Liam Moore	Episode: "Dead in the Water"
2004	Medical Investigation	David Weiner	Episode: "Team"
2004	Boston Legal	Byron Kaneb	Episode: "Catch and Release"
2004	LAX	Danny	Episode: "Secret Santa"
2005	Without a Trace	Officer Tim Orley	Episode: "Penitence"
2005	Medium	Detective Rickey	2 episodes
2005	Over There	Mr. Parker	Episode: "Situation Normal"
2005	The West Wing	Republican National Committee Chairman Steve Hodder	2 episodes
2005	Mrs. Harris	Sporting Goods Clerk	Television film
2005	Las Vegas	Ray Brennan	Episode: "Everything Old Is You Again"
2006	Cold Case	Wayne Nelson	Episode: "Death Penalty: Final Appeal"
2006	Windfall	Damien's Father	4 episodes
2006	Just Legal	Judge	Episode: "The Code"
2006	Nip/Tuck	Mark Noble	Episode: "Shari Noble"
2006	Justice	Jack Clark	Episode: "Crucified"
2007	Grey's Anatomy	Vince	2 episodes: "Walking on Water," "Drowning on Dry Land"
2007	The Unit	Supervisor Marsh	2 episodes
2008–2013	Breaking Bad	DEA Agent Hank Schrader	Main role, 51 episodes
2008	Saving Grace	Ross Ford	Episode: "Have a Seat, Earl"
2008	Terminator: The Sarah Connor Chronicles	Nelson	2 episodes
2008	Bones	Don Timmons	Episode: "The Finger in the Nest"
2009	Lost	Howard Grey	Episode: "Some Like It Hoth"
2009	True Blood	Leon	Episode: "Shake and Fingerpop"
2009	The Cleaner	Mr. Fisher	Episode: "Path of Least Resistance"
2010	Criminal Minds	Detective John Barton	Episode: "...A Thousand Words"
2010	The Glades	Michael Nelson	Episode: "Doppleganger"
2010	Lie to Me	Dawkins	Episode: "Darkness and Light"
2010	Dark Blue	Cahill	Episode: "Jane Wayne"
2010	Chase	Sheriff Keagan	Episode: "The Posse"
2010	The Good Guys	Pike	Episode: "Cop Killer"
2010	The Whole Truth	Mike Taylor	Episode: "Cold Case"
2010	Medium	Paul Scanlon	2 episodes
2010	Tim and Eric Awesome Show, Great Job!	Shell Tong	Episode: "Chrimbus Special" (deleted scene)
2011	Fairly Legal	Coach Gardner	Episode: "Benched"
2011	The Defenders	Donnie Barrett	Episode: "Nevada v. Donnie the Numbers Guy"
2011	Off the Map	Morris Cooper	Episode: "It's a Leaf"
2011	The Stoned Ages	Narrator	Documentary
2011	Law & Order: LA	Bob Kentner	Episode: "Westwood"
2011	CSI: NY	Lieutenant Mitchell Adler	Episode: "Officer Involved"
2011	Castle	Captain Peterson	Episode: "Cops & Robbers"
2011	The Mentalist	Sergeant Don Henderson	Episode: "Pink Tops"
2012	Body of Proof	Special Agent Brendan Johnson	2 episodes
2012	Eagleheart	Deke	Episode: "Blues"
2012	Key & Peele	Mexican Drug Cartel Leader	Episode: "When You Don't Know How to Count Money"
2012	The Cleveland Show	Fire Chief	Voice; Episode: "Flush of Genius"
2013	Whitney	Wayne Miller	Episode: "Nesting"
2013–2015	Under the Dome	James 'Big Jim' Rennie	Main role, 39 episodes
2014	American Dad!	Head of Security	Voice; Episode: "Big Stan on Campus"
2015	Sons of Liberty	Benjamin Franklin	3 episodes
2015	Unbreakable Kimmy Schmidt	M. Le Loup	Episode: "Kimmy's In a Love Triangle!"
2015–2016	Sofia the First	Mazzimo	Voice; 2 episodes
2016	Mack & Moxy	Admirable Dean	Episode: "You're My Hero"
2016–2018	The Big Bang Theory	Colonel Richard Williams	6 episodes
2017	Girlboss	Jay Marlowe	5 episodes
2017	Get Shorty	Bob Grace	Episode: "Grace Under Fire"
2017–2022	Claws	Uncle Daddy	Main role, 40 episodes
2017–2018	Scandal	Fenton Glackland	5 episodes
2019	The Act	Russ	Episode: "Two Wolverines"
2020	Better Call Saul	DEA Agent Hank Schrader	Episodes: "The Guy for This", "Namaste"
2020	Superstore	Howard Fox	Episode: "Myrtle"
2021–2022	United States of Al	Art Dugan	Main role, 35 episodes
2021	Nova Vita	Devon Washington	10 episodes
2024	Law & Order: Organized Crime	Randall Stabler	Recurring role (season 4); main cast (season 5-)
2024	Curb Your Enthusiasm	Judge Whittaker	Episode: "No Lessons Learned"
2024	Ghosts	Frank	Episode: "Sam's Dad"
2026	Liam and Michael	Michael's Father	5 episodes
2026	Stuart Fails to Save the Universe	Alternate Captain Richard Williams	

== Awards and nominations ==
Year	Award	Category	Title	Result
2011	Saturn Awards	Best Supporting Actor on Television	Breaking Bad	Nominated
2012	Screen Actors Guild Awards	Outstanding Performance by an Ensemble in a Drama Series	Breaking Bad	Nominated
2013	Screen Actors Guild Awards	Outstanding Performance by an Ensemble in a Drama Series	Breaking Bad	Nominated
2014	Screen Actors Guild Awards	Outstanding Performance by an Ensemble in a Drama Series	Breaking Bad	Won
2014	Saturn Awards	Best Supporting Actor on Television	Under the Dome	Nominated
