= Magic Man (Better Call Saul) =

- Better Call Saul episode
- Promotional poster
- Episode no.: Season 5 Episode 1
- Directed by: Bronwen Hughes
- Written by: Peter Gould
- Original air date: February 23, 2020
- Running time: 54 minutes

Guest appearances
- Robert Forster as Ed Galbraith; Lavell Crawford as Huell Babineaux; Max Arciniega as Domingo "Krazy-8" Molina; Javier Grajeda as Juan Bolsa; Josh Fadem as The Camera Guy; Hayley Holmes as The Make-Up Girl; Peter Diseth as Bill Oakley; Don Harvey as Jeff; Roland Buck III as Bobby; Ben Bela Böhm as Kai; Stefan Kapičić as Casper; Sasha Feldman as Sticky; Morgan Krantz as Ron

Episode chronology
← Previous "Winner"	Next → "50% Off"
- Better Call Saul season 5

"Magic Man" is the first episode of the fifth season of the AMC television series Better Call Saul, a spin-off series of Breaking Bad. The episode aired on February 23, 2020, on AMC, in the United States. Outside of the United States, the episode premiered on streaming service Netflix in several countries.

== Plot ==
=== Opening ===
After leaving the hospital, Gene Takavic suspects he is being followed and spends several days away from Omaha. He returns and stakes out his apartment but resumes his normal routine after finding nothing suspicious. After Gene returns to work, Jeff, the cab driver who picked him up at the hospital (Note: During the events of "Smoke".) approaches him and reveals he recognizes Gene as Saul Goodman. Gene plans to flee and calls Ed Galbraith for help, but changes his mind and says he will handle the problem himself.

=== Main story ===
Jimmy McGill explains to Kim Wexler that the "Saul Goodman" alias from his prepaid cell phone business gives him an instant client base for a criminal law practice. Kim is wary but supportive and presents Jimmy with gifts to celebrate his return to practicing law. Saul runs an event to build publicity for his law practice and reluctantly gives out 50% off coupons. He generates more publicity by using his camera crew to fake a confrontation with Deputy District Attorney Bill Oakley.

Lalo Salamanca wonders about Werner Ziegler's identity, his reason for being in Albuquerque, and connection to Gus Fring. Nacho Varga and Domingo Molina inform him of quality issues with cocaine the Salamancas received from Gus, which Lalo confirms. He meets with Gus and Juan Bolsa, where Gus falsely says Werner was working on a chiller under Mike Ehrmantraut's supervision at the Los Pollos Hermanos farm, but fled after stealing cocaine. Gus claims he then attempted to cover for the loss by replacing the cocaine with local, inferior methamphetamine. Lalo outwardly accepts Gus' story and apology, but remains suspicious. Juan privately warns Lalo that Don Eladio and the cartel trust Gus, so he should consider the matter closed.

Because of Lalo's presence in Albuquerque, Gus stops work on the underground meth lab. Mike sends Werner's men home, warned to remain silent, and fully paid for the half-completed job. Gus informs Mike that Werner's widow accepted their story about a fatal construction accident and says she was well-compensated. Gus offers to continue paying Mike during the construction delay, but Mike declines, frustrated with Gus' seeming lack of compassion for Werner.

One of Kim's pro bono clients faces years in prison but rejects a favorable plea bargain, so Jimmy offers to trick him into accepting. Kim declines, but later uses the idea herself, then privately vents her frustrations.

== Production ==
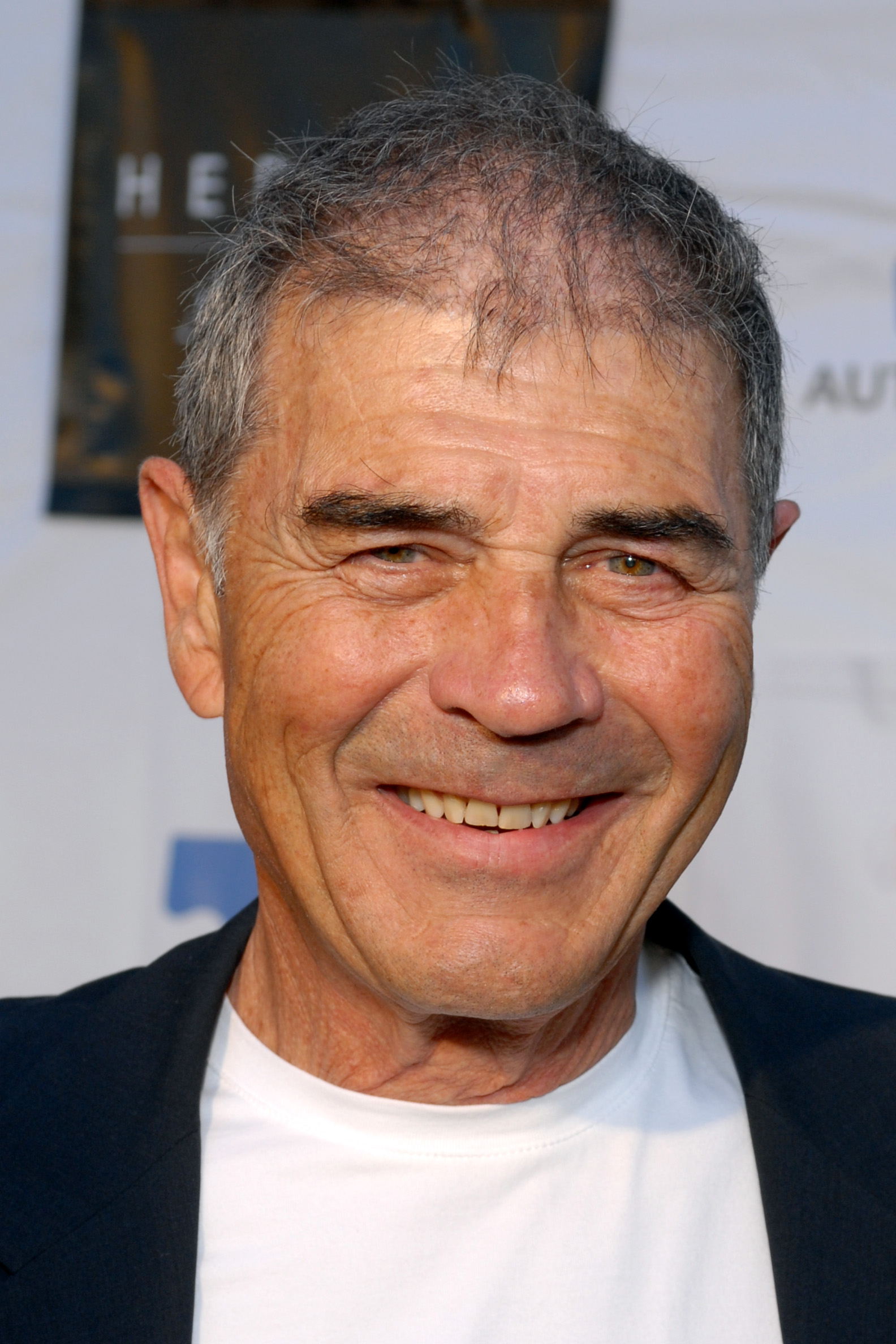
"Magic Man" was dedicated to Robert Forster, who played the disappearer Ed.

The episode was dedicated to Robert Forster, who died in October 2019. Forster played Ed, the disappearer from Breaking Bad, reprising his role in this episode, as well as the film El Camino: A Breaking Bad Movie. Showrunner Peter Gould, who had written and directed Forster's prior appearance on Breaking Bad in "Granite State", had wanted to bring Forster's character into Better Call Saul for some time but could not figure out a way to do so. As his writing team found a way to do so within the fifth-season premiere, he learned that Vince Gilligan had written in the character for El Camino. Originally, Forster's role was a vocal cameo only, given the cost of rebuilding the vacuum shop. However, with El Camino's production, producer Melissa Bernstein recognized they would be shooting the vacuum shop and that Forster would be available, and thus arranged for Gilligan to film the Better Call Saul scene concurrently, months before any other Better Call Saul fifth season scenes were to be filmed. Gilligan's production role was uncredited in the episode. In addition to dedicating the episode to Forster, Gould invited several of Forster's family and friends to the screening of the premiere.

The episode was directed by Bronwen Hughes, who had directed the 2008 Breaking Bad episode "Crazy Handful of Nothin'".

The background music used during the quick-cut montage in which Saul sits in a tent and gives away his remaining phones is trumpeter Lee Morgan's 1964 soul-jazz hit "The Sidewinder", and the song played during the flashforward is "Welcome to My World" by Jim Reeves.

== Reception ==
"Magic Man" received critical acclaim. On Rotten Tomatoes, it garnered a perfect 100% rating with an average score of 8.7/10 based on 20 reviews. The site's critical consensus is, "Jimmy McGill is dead, long live Saul Goodman in a doom-laden premiere that wrings heartbreaking juxtaposition between the 'Magic Man' himself embracing his sleazy stride and the haunted fugitive he will inevitably become."

=== Ratings ===
An estimated 1.6 million viewers watched "Magic Man" on its first broadcast, a 4% increase over the fourth season finale episode, though down 10% from that season's premiere. Viewership was aided by the mid-season premiere of The Walking Dead that led in the show.
