= Hank Schrader =

Character in the Breaking Bad franchise

- Breaking Bad character
- Dean Norris as Hank Schrader
- First appearance: "Pilot"; Breaking Bad; January 20, 2008
- Last appearance: "Namaste"; Better Call Saul; March 9, 2020
- Created by: Vince Gilligan
- Portrayed by: Dean Norris

In-universe information
- Full name: Henry R. Schrader
- Nickname: Hank
- Titles: Special Agent; ASAC of the Albuquerque DEA offices
- Occupation: DEA agent
- Affiliation: Drug Enforcement Administration (DEA)
- Family: Walter White (brother-in-law); Skyler White (sister-in-law); Walter White Jr. (nephew); Holly White (niece)
- Spouse: Marie Lambert
- Home: Albuquerque, New Mexico, United States
- Date of birth: March 1966
- Date of death: March 19, 2010 (aged 43–44)

Henry R. Schrader ASAC (/ʃreɪdər/) is a fictional character in the American crime drama series Breaking Bad, portrayed by Dean Norris and created by Vince Gilligan. A special agent of the Drug Enforcement Administration (DEA), Hank is the brother-in-law of protagonist Walter White. After Walter becomes an enigmatic drug lord known as "Heisenberg", Hank spends the majority of the series trying to apprehend "Heisenberg", unaware of his true identity. Hank's character development over the course of the series and Norris's performance have been critically acclaimed, with many labeling him as the true hero of Breaking Bad.

Norris returned to the role in a guest appearance in the fifth season of the spin-off series Better Call Saul.

== Character biography ==
Henry R. Schrader is the brother-in-law of main character Walter White, and is a DEA agent in Albuquerque, New Mexico. Throughout the series, he leads the investigation of the methamphetamine cook "Heisenberg"—unaware that the elusive drug kingpin is his own brother-in-law. Hank is also faced with numerous threats from the rival drug cartels, which take a toll on his mental health as the series progresses; and eventually starts taking more extreme measures to find "Heisenberg" and arrest him.

=== Background ===
Hank was a special agent with the DEA, where he rose through the ranks to become the supervisor of all investigations handled by his Albuquerque office, under the watchful eye of ASAC George Merkert (Michael Shamus Wiles) and SAC Ramey. He is married to Marie (Betsy Brandt), with whom he has no children. He is close to his family-by-marriage, the Whites: Walt, his wife (and Marie's sister) Skyler (Anna Gunn), and their son Walter Jr. (RJ Mitte). In contrast with the mild-mannered Walt, Hank is extroverted, ambitious, and apparently fearless, eager to take on dangerous investigations to further his career. Beneath his tough, unflappable exterior, however, he struggles with some of his own vulnerabilities: he had cold feet when it came to marrying Marie, and despite his ambition, he is afraid to move outside his comfort zone at work, primarily due to the effects of PTSD since killing Tuco Salamanca and subsequent bloody encounters during drug busts in El Paso.

As a hobby, Hank home brews his own beer, which he bottles under the name "Schraderbräu". After he gets shot by the Salamanca cousins, he spends part of season 4 taking up mineral collecting, much to Marie's chagrin.

=== Better Call Saul ===
==== Season 5 ====
Hank and his partner Steven Gomez (Steven Michael Quezada) arrive to interview drug dealer Domingo Molina (Max Arciniega), also known as "Krazy-8", who is planning to expose several dead drops to make a deal with prosecutors. Before he can speak, the meeting is interrupted by Saul Goodman (Bob Odenkirk), acting as Domingo's lawyer. Hank becomes suspicious and believes that there are no dead drops, but Saul convinces him to take Domingo under his protection as a personal CI. Both Hank and Steven leave, unaware that Lalo Salamanca orchestrated the events to get Domingo out of jail and have a way to manipulate the DEA.

=== Breaking Bad ===
==== Season 1 ====
During Walt's fiftieth birthday party, Hank shows off a news report covering a meth bust that he led. Later, Walt takes up Hank's offer to go on a ride-along. Based on a tip from Krazy-8, Hank's team raids a meth lab while Walt stays in the car, where he witnesses his former student Jesse Pinkman (Aaron Paul) escaping the bust but does not say anything to Hank. Secretly, Walt engages with Jesse to start to produce their own meth using chemistry equipment from the school Walt teaches at. Due to the precursors they used, the product gains a unique blue tint and has extremely high purity. Walt takes the name "Heisenberg" as he and Jesse sell the blue meth to the local drug trade. The blue meth and "Heisenberg" quickly draw the attention of Hank and the DEA. Hank's initial lead traces back to Walt's school, but Hank wrongly arrests the school janitor.

Hank generally teases Walt through this period, then when Walt tells the family that he is suffering from terminal lung cancer, Hank promises to be there for him, and to take care of Walter Jr. and Walt's unborn daughter. He also takes Walter Jr. under his wing, trying to "scare him straight" when he believes Walter Jr. is smoking marijuana. Walt explains his association with Jesse to Skyler by falsely confessing to buying marijuana from Jesse. This information soon makes its way to Marie, and then to Hank.

==== Season 2 ====
After a drug deal goes bad, Walt and Jesse are kidnapped by the unstable Tuco Salamanca (Raymond Cruz) and taken to a remote abode with his uncle, retired drug cartel boss Hector Salamanca (Mark Margolis). Hank helps with efforts to find Walt, and traces him via Jesse to Tuco's abode. Just before Hank arrives, Walt and Jesse manage to escape, wounding Tuco in the process. Hank kills Tuco in a shootout and arrests Hector. Meanwhile, Walt and Jesse flee back to Albuquerque, where Walt explains his disappearance to Skyler as the result of a fugue state. Hank questions Hector about the blue meth and Heisenberg, but Hector refuses to answer. Hank also questions Jesse, but Jesse provides no conclusive statements to provide leads to Heisenberg.

Hank is promoted and transferred to the El Paso, Texas DEA office for killing Tuco. Though initially happy, Hank quickly realizes he doesn't fit in with his Spanish-speaking colleagues and also starts having panic attacks. During a joint DEA/Mexican police operation, an informant, Tortuga (Danny Trejo), is beheaded and his head used to hide an explosive, killing several DEA agents and officers; Hank escapes unharmed as he had fled on having a panic attack upon seeing the head of the informant. Hank develops symptoms of PTSD and transfers back to the Albuquerque office to continue his investigation into the blue meth.

Meanwhile, Walt and Jesse, having lost the Salamancas for selling meth, have engaged with Jesse's friends. One, Badger (Matt L. Jones), gets caught in a police sting, and Hank presses hard on Badger to reveal Heisenberg's identity. Walt gets help from the fast-talking lawyer Saul Goodman (Bob Odenkirk) to get a fall guy to act as Heisenberg, but Badger approaches the wrong person while Hank and his team look on. Walt rushes in to obstruct Hank's view to correct Badger in time. While Saul's hired Heisenberg is arrested, Hank suspects the real Heisenberg remains at large.

==== Season 3 ====
Hank remains committed to finding the identity of Heisenberg, but his superiors start to believe the case is unsolvable and want him to move on to other investigations. He picks up a lead on the case after Jesse uses some of the blue meth to pay for gas for the recreational vehicle he and Walt use to cook the product. Hank investigates all RVs in Albuquerque through the DMV and finds an RV without a renewed registration. Hank tracks the RV down to the mother of Jesse's deceased friend Christian "Combo" Ortega (Rodney Rush), who had been killed while selling blue meth on a rival gang's territory. As he surveils Jesse, Hank calls Walt for information on his former student, giving Walt the opportunity to get the RV to a junkyard before he can find it. Hank follows Jesse to the junkyard, where Jesse and Walt hide in the RV. Walt gives instructions to Jesse to prevent Hank from entering the RV legally and gets Saul to lure Hank away from the junkyard by phoning him with a fake claim about Marie being hospitalized. He abruptly leaves, allowing them to crush the RV in the meantime, destroying the evidence. After learning that the accident was a hoax, an infuriated Hank goes to Jesse's home and assaults him. Jesse is hospitalized and threatens to sue, while Hank is suspended from the DEA without pay.

As Hank is leaving his disciplinary meeting, he receives an anonymous call from Gus Fring's henchman Victor, warning him that he is about to be killed by Leonel and Marco Salamanca (Daniel and Luis Moncada) in revenge for killing Tuco; though Gus has told the brothers to target Hank instead of Walt, Gus's intention is the destruction of the Salamancas and their cartel. Hank is able to kill one brother and mortally wound the other, but he himself becomes temporarily paralyzed from the waist down after the gunfight, with the doctors fearing he may become paraplegic without physical therapy. Marie finds their insurance will not cover this, and Walt and Skyler agree to help cover the costs, unbeknownst to Hank.

==== Season 4 ====
Hank struggles through his recovery due to his helplessness, harshly lashing out at Marie, and tries to collect minerals to pass the time. His interest is piqued when the Albuquerque Police Department asks him to help with looking over evidence from the murder of Gale Boetticher (David Costabile), who had been Walt's lab assistant at Gus's meth superlab under an industrial laundry. Gale was killed by Jesse on Walt's orders to prevent Gus from having them replaced with Gale. Among the evidence is a lab notebook with Gale's notes on the construction of the lab, the synthesis of meth, and other details that lead Hank to believe Gale was Heisenberg. During a shared dinner, Hank talks about Gale's notebook, and Walt drunkenly suggests Gale was merely copying the real Heisenberg's work.

Hank is curious at this comment, and reviewing the evidence again, makes a connection between Gale and Gus. Hank, only just starting to physically recover, leans on Walt to help him investigate Gus's activities, the Los Pollos Hermanos restaurant chain and its parent company, Madrigal Electromotive, and properties they own in Albuquerque, including the industrial laundry. Walt panics knowing that this not only may lead Hank to discover that he is Heisenberg but may lead to Gus taking deadly action to end Hank's investigation, as his relationship with Gus was already strained over Gale's murder. Walt has Saul fake a threat on Hank's life, and the DEA arranges for around-the-clock protection for Hank's and Walt's families, temporarily halting Hank's investigation. This also allows Walt to operate without interference to take out Gus by working with Hector after learning he and Gus are nemeses. Hector claims to want to talk to the DEA, and Hank is brought under protection to help with the interview, but Hector then refuses to cooperate and is returned to the nursing home. This was part of Walt's plan as Gus, learning of Hector's interview, goes to see Hector, upon which Hector triggers a pipe bomb Walt had planted on his wheelchair, killing them both. Walt and Jesse subsequently destroy the superlab.

==== Season 5 ====
===== Part 1 =====
The destruction of the superlab leads to evidence directly tying to Gus and the drug trade, and Hank is heralded as a hero. They secure a laptop from Gus's office and put it into police evidence. On learning of this, Walt and Jesse with help from Mike Ehrmantraut (Jonathan Banks) use a giant electromagnet to try to wipe the laptop, making a mess of the evidence room. The police find nothing on the laptop but from a picture frame broken in the destruction, the numbers to several accounts of Gus's that point to Mike's informants that have been helping to keep the drug trade secret. By this point, Hank's superiors have concluded that Gus was Heisenberg and tell Hank to drop the case, but Hank still believes there is more and wants to pursue the informants tied to the accounts. Walt gets the informants' names and arranges for their murders before they can be questioned.

Several months pass, in which Walt has accumulated around $80 million and has left the drug trade. Despite blue meth still being on the streets, Hank has no leads and therefore has given up his investigation and moved on. At dinner at the Whites, Hank goes to the bathroom and while there, pages through a copy of Leaves of Grass by Walt Whitman that Gale had given Walter. He recognizes the handwriting from Gale's notebook, and from Gale's dedication to Walt, referring to him as his "other favorite W.W.". Hank is shocked to conclude that Walt is Heisenberg.

===== Part 2 =====
Hank feigns a stomach bug to leave early, taking the copy of Leaves of Grass with him and suffering another panic attack. Later, he sneaks a GPS onto Walt's car. Walt discovers the copy of the book missing and the GPS device, similar to the one used to track Gus, and confronts Hank. Hank asserts Walt is Heisenberg, but Walt neither confirms nor denies, only that his cancer has returned and by the time Hank can prove anything, he will be dead. Hank demands Walt to tell Skyler and the children to stay with him, but Walt refuses. Hank tries to talk to Skyler, but she stays silent about what she knows. Marie learns some details through Skyler, but Hank still has insufficient evidence to go forward against Walt.

Jesse is arrested and Hank tries to convince him to turn against Walt, but Jesse refuses, still angered over Hank's prior assault. In an attempt to dissuade Hank from investigating him further, Walt creates a fake confessional videotape claiming Hank is Heisenberg and that Walt was blackmailed into making meth for him. Hank also realizes that his post-shooting physical therapy was paid for with Walt's drug money, making him an accessory after the fact. Walt and Jesse have a falling out after Jesse learns Walt poisoned the son of his girlfriend Andrea (Emily Rios) to enlist his help in eliminating Gus. Jesse attempts to burn down Walter's home in retaliation, but Hank stops Jesse and convinces him they should work together to take down Walt.

Hank initially tries to have Jesse meet with Walt while wearing a wire, but Jesse backs out at the last minute, fearing Walt will kill him. Instead, Jesse suggests they target Walt's money, which they know has been hidden as cash somewhere locally. After tricking Saul's bodyguard Huell Babineaux, Hank has Jesse call Walt pretending to have found the money and preparing to destroy it. Walt takes off to the money, buried on the Tohajiilee Indian Reservation, but when he arrives there, he realizes Jesse has tricked him. Walt then orders a hit on him through Jack Welker (Michael Bowen), the leader of a neo-Nazi biker gang that sells Walt's meth.

Jesse soon arrives with Hank and Gomez, and Walt tries to call off the hit, preparing to surrender himself to Hank. However, Jack's gang arrives anyway and a firefight breaks out, in which Gomez is killed and Hank is critically wounded. Walt pleads to Jack to spare Hank's life, offering his entire fortune to Jack. Hank refuses to beg for his life and chastises Walt for not realizing Jack already made his decision. Accepting his fate, Hank is shot by Jack. Jack's men bury Hank and Gomez's bodies in the hole Walt had stored his money, stealing most of it but leaving one barrel containing around $11 million for Walt.

Several months after Hank's and Gomez's deaths, Walt returns to Albuquerque from hiding in New Hampshire. He meets Skyler and provides her a lottery ticket with the GPS coordinates of their bodies to negotiate a deal with the authorities. Walt avenges Hank's death by killing Jack and his men with a remote-activated machine gun before dying of a gunshot wound from a bullet that ricocheted into him during the attack.

=== Post-Breaking Bad ===
During the final episodes of Better Call Saul, taking place in 2010, it is revealed that Skyler was successful in making a deal with the prosecutor and that the bodies of Hank and Gomez were successfully recovered. In the final episode, Marie accuses Saul of enabling Walter and the events that led to Hank's murder. During his trial, a repentant Saul forgoes a plea deal and confesses the full extent of his involvement in Walt's drug empire. Acknowledging the role he played in causing the deaths of those associated with Walt, including Hank and Gomez, Saul shocked the courtroom but gave Marie and Blanca closure in their husbands' deaths.

== Casting and creation ==
Prior to being cast in Breaking Bad, Dean Norris had a history of being typecast as law enforcement and military type characters. Norris said, "I guess you have a certain look, it's kind of an authoritative law enforcement-type look, and that look is certainly the first thing that people cast you with before you get a chance to do some acting." Vince Gilligan had talked to an actual DEA agent about creating Hank's character.

== Development ==
Critics have commented on the character's development. NPR writes of his character's evolution "Hank Schrader has evolved from a knuckleheaded jock into a complex, sympathetic and even heroic counterpoint to the show's anti-hero, [...] Walter White." Mary Kaye Schilling of Vulture opined: "It's thanks to [Norris] that Breaking Bad's Hank Schrader has gone from a cliché-spewing booya DEA agent — essentially comic relief — to a savvy, vulnerable mensch who could be the show's ultimate hero." Norris noted the realism of Hank's "tough cop" and "cliché machine" persona, comparing his mannerisms to his best friend growing up, also a cop. Norris explained that people with jobs in law enforcement have to put on a bravado facade because they have to deal with unscrupulous people all day; the only other option would be to let the job affect them personally, which would compromise their effectiveness.

Gilligan said Hank was supposed to be a "hail fellow well met and a figure of worship for Walt, Jr." but that he developed him when he realized how "smart, sensitive, and well educated" Norris was. Norris and Gilligan both wanted Hank to be smart and capable; "Otherwise", Norris said, "he's just a doofus and you'll dismiss him." Norris notes that Hank teases Walt in the pilot and the first season and makes racist jokes about his DEA partner Steven Gomez. However, such jokes were toned down as the series progressed and were turned into good-natured ribbing.

Sean Collins of Rolling Stone considered Hank in the pilot to be an "obnoxious blowhard". Gilligan had not considered the character as much more than a foil to Walt at first. However, as Gilligan got to know Norris, he developed Hank into a "more nuanced and complex character" who makes both "personal and professional growth".

Frazier Moore of the Associated Press wrote of Hank's introduction in the pilot: "Hank seemed a potentially problematic character. With his cocky, macho style, he was perilously close to a stereotype [...] Norris has brought depth and nuance to his character, emerging as fully the equal of his fine fellow cast mates [...] as he displayed not just braggadocio but also emotional trauma." Norris and Gilligan admitted that Hank began as a "mechanical construct" whose main purpose was to provide comic relief.

Hank begins showing signs of post-traumatic stress disorder (PTSD) in "Breakage" after killing Tuco Salamanca in "Grilled", the first deconstruction of his "tough cop" persona. Norris attributed the PTSD to the fact that it is actually very rare for law enforcement officers to draw their weapons, let alone kill someone in a combat situation. Mary Kaye Schilling praised the way the writers handled the PTSD and how they waited an entire season to explain the cause of it. Noel Murray of The A.V. Club compared Hank's character in season 1 to a "veiled (and unacknowledged) Vic Mackey parody" and praised his development which began with his suffering PTSD. Seth Amitin of IGN noted that Hank's PTSD humanized the character, as Amitin thought of him as an "emotional rock" who is usually unfazed. However, Amitin thought that Hank's humanization and inner struggle fit in with the other character's arcs and the series' themes.

Of Hank's fight with Walt, Emily Nussbaum of The New Yorker wrote that series "placed Hank, once a minor, comic character on the show, dead center in the role of hero". Graeme Virtue of The Guardian wrote that Norris "evolved his character Hank Schrader from cocksure DEA meathead to the closest thing the show has to a moral center".

Hank went through significant character development in the third season episode "One Minute". Norris felt that Hank's self-realization in the episode was the turning point toward his becoming a better man and set the stage for his decisions later in the series. Norris said that "Hank wants a clean soul", and he kept tearing up while filming a particularly dramatic speech, though the director kept telling him not to. Norris was eventually filmed from the side to obscure the fact that he was crying.

In the early fourth season episodes, Hank is bedridden after being shot multiple times in the chest by Tuco Salamanca's cousins and is increasingly hostile toward Marie while she tries to take care of him. Gilligan and the writers liked the idea of Hank not acting heroically or noble in his suffering and felt that this arc would be most true to Hank's character.

When asked about how Hank could have not known his brother-in-law was Heisenberg, Norris said that Walt was Hank's blind spot, and that Hank had this preconceived notion of a drug kingpin in his head and it did not coincide with his image of Walt as meek and oblivious. After Hank finally discovers that Walt is Heisenberg, Norris had to balance betrayal with rage, citing the hurt of Walt's betrayal of his trust as his most significant emotion. Norris said that in the episode "Blood Money", Hank's emotions finally take over.

Norris said that he thinks Hank's moral code is concretely defined in "One Minute", when he accepts the consequences for assaulting Jesse even though he could have gotten away with it. In an interview during the first half of season 5, Norris expressed his puzzlement at viewers who "don't know who to root for" and that he sees Walt as a straightforward villain.

Norris asked Gilligan to kill Hank off midway through the fifth season, as Norris had already booked a comedy pilot before he knew AMC would stretch the fifth into two years. Gilligan declined his request, as Hank's arc was integral to the series' final episodes. When the spin-off Better Call Saul was first announced, Norris initially stated that he wasn't interested in appearing, saying that he felt the Breaking Bad story was complete and that a spin-off would be unnecessary.

Peter Gould was initially hesitant to include Hank in Better Call Saul since the character had primarily been developed and written by Gilligan, who despite serving as co-executive producer had not been in the writer's room for the show since Season 3. Despite his earlier lukewarm reception to the spin-off Dean Norris himself, however, welcomed playing the version of Hank before he became afflicted with PTSD and depression. He particularly enjoyed the on-screen reunion with Steve Gomez actor Steven Michael Quezada.

While conceiving the story for El Camino: A Breaking Bad Movie, Gilligan considered to include Hank in the story, feeling that his inclusion would have been great, but ultimately desisted from the idea due to his feelings that the film should focus only in the most important characters in Jesse Pinkman's life, which Hank wasn't.

== Reception ==
Hank's development as a character and Norris's performance have both received critical acclaim. Frank Girardot of Pasadena Star-News, an old friend of Norris', says that he watched Norris grow into the role, and praised him as "a damn good actor. Certainly the best on TV right now."

Dean Norris's acting in "Blood Money", especially the climactic scene where Hank confronts Walt over the latter's identity as Heisenberg, was lauded by critics. James Poniewozik of Time wrote "Norris and Cranston are both eye magnets here, and the force just arcs between them as your attention is drawn irresistibly to both at once." Cinema Blend's Kelly West said Walt and Hank's conversation might have been one of the "most heated and emotional moments of the series", praising Cranston and Norris. David Berry of National Post and Scott Meslow of The Week also praised Norris. Steve Marsi of TV Fanatic wrote of the climax "Dean Norris's expressions conveyed how dismayed, distraught, vengeful and stunned he was at the same time." TVLine named Dean Norris the "Performer of the Week" for his work in "Blood Money". In doing so, TVLine highlighted Hank's development over the course of the series, citing the character's evolution from "an unapologetic blowhard" in the pilot to "someone you truly want to see win".

Ross Douthat of The New York Times called Hank the hero of Breaking Bad and wrote that "one of the show's most impressive and important achievements has been the construction of a compelling, interesting, entertaining good person, capable of competing with Walter White, the anti-hero, for the audience's attention and interest and affection."

In 2011, Norris was nominated at the 37th Saturn Awards for Best Supporting Actor on Television for the third season, but lost to John Noble for his performance as Dr. Walter Bishop in Fringe.
