= 50% Off =

- Better Call Saul episode
- Promotional poster
- Episode no.: Season 5 Episode 2
- Directed by: Norberto Barba
- Written by: Alison Tatlock
- Editing by: Skip Macdonald
- Original air date: February 24, 2020
- Running time: 46 minutes

Guest appearances
- Kerry Condon as Stacey Ehrmantraut; Max Arciniega as Domingo "Krazy-8" Molina; Ray Campbell as Tyrus Kitt; Julie Pearl as ADA Suzanne Ericsen; Juan Carlos Cantu as Manuel Varga; Jeremiah Bitsui as Victor; KeiLyn Durrel Jones as Blingy; Peter Diseth as Bill Oakley; Sasha Feldman as Sticky; Morgan Krantz as Ron; Katerina Tannenbaum as Amber; Poppy Liu as Jo; Mark Margolis as Hector Salamanca; Juliet Donenfeld as Kaylee Ehrmantraut

Episode chronology
← Previous "Magic Man"	Next → "The Guy for This"
- Better Call Saul season 5

"50% Off" is the second episode of the fifth season of the AMC television series Better Call Saul, a spin-off series of Breaking Bad. The episode aired on February 24, 2020, on AMC, in the United States. Outside of the United States, the episode premiered on the streaming service Netflix in several countries.

== Plot ==
Victor and Tyrus Kitt bring Nacho Varga to Gus Fring. Threatening harm to Nacho's father, Manuel, Gus demands that Nacho gain Lalo Salamanca's trust and obtain information on the Salamancas' activities. Later, Lalo tells Hector he does not trust Gus; Hector confirms the cartel tolerates Gus only because he earns well.

Sticky and Ron, two drug users who received Jimmy McGill's 50% off business card, (Note: During the events of "Magic Man".) go on a multi-day crime binge. They purchase numerous bags of cocaine from the Salamanca stash house, but the bags get stuck in the drainpipe. The police arrive just before Domingo Molina can dislodge the drugs, and he is arrested. Right before the police raid the house, Nacho climbs over rooftops to sneak in and retrieve the drug stash, impressing Lalo. He is initially worried Domingo may talk in jail, but after Nacho vouches for him, decides a better way to make use of the situation.

Still reeling over Werner Ziegler's death, Mike Ehrmantraut has regularly been drinking to excess. While babysitting Kaylee, he lashes out at her when she asks for details about her father.

Kim Wexler is still apprehensive about Jimmy practicing law as Saul Goodman. Jimmy and Kim attend an open house together at Jimmy's insistence in an attempt to reconcile. Kim again thanks Jimmy for his effort to help her client accept the plea bargain, but says she does not want to succeed by lying.

Jimmy turns on the Saul Goodman persona at the courthouse and avoids trials while obtaining favorable plea bargains for his clients, generating fees by producing a high case turnover. Assistant District Attorney Suzanne Ericsen, suspicious of Jimmy since Huell Babineaux's arrest, (Note: During the events of "Coushatta".) insists on formally resolving their pending cases during an already-scheduled appointment. Howard Hamlin invites Jimmy to lunch, and Jimmy is unsettled by the reminder of his past. Jimmy later pays a custodian, the brother of one of his clients, to disable the courthouse elevator while he is inside with Ericsen, enabling him to informally work out several favorable deals. Nacho drives up after Jimmy leaves the courthouse and coerces him into his car.

== Production ==
The episode ties in two Easter eggs to Breaking Bad as the Better Call Saul narrative draws closer to that point, according to showrunner Peter Gould and writer Alison Tatlock. One is the origin of Domingo's "Krazy-8" nickname (ocho loco), which is revealed to have been given to him by Lalo during a poker game after Domingo fell for Lalo's bluff and folded on what would have been a winning set of 8s. The second is the introduction of Saul's Bluetooth headset, which he was seen wearing frequently during Breaking Bad.

== Reception ==
"50% Off" received critical acclaim. On Rotten Tomatoes, it garnered a perfect 100% rating with an average score of 8.14/10 based on 15 reviews. The site's critical consensus is, "'50% Off' is no bargain chapter, settling the season into Better Call Saul's familiar pace while taking big strides in coalescing the series' parallel worlds."

=== Ratings ===
"50% Off" was watched by 1.06 million viewers on its first broadcast, down from 1.60 million from the season premiere the previous night, making it the least viewed episode of the series.
