= Crawl Space (Breaking Bad) =

- Breaking Bad episode
- Walt cackles maniacally in the crawl space underneath his home.
- Episode no.: Season 4 Episode 11
- Directed by: Scott Winant
- Written by: George Mastras; Sam Catlin
- Cinematography by: Michael Slovis
- Editing by: Skip Macdonald
- Original air date: September 25, 2011
- Running time: 47 minutes

Guest appearances
- Mark Margolis as Hector Salamanca; Christopher Cousins as Ted Beneke; Emily Rios as Andrea Cantillo; Bill Burr as Patrick Kuby; JB Blanc as Dr. Barry Goodman; Ray Campbell as Tyrus Kitt; Lavell Crawford as Huell Babineaux; Tina Parker as Francesca Liddy; Ian Posada as Brock Cantillo; Christopher King as Chris Mara

Episode chronology
← Previous "Salud"	Next → "End Times"
- Breaking Bad season 4

"Crawl Space" is the eleventh episode of the fourth season of the American television crime drama series Breaking Bad, and the 44th overall episode of the series. It originally aired on AMC in the United States on September 25, 2011.

== Plot ==
Making their escape after killing off Don Eladio Vuente and the Cartel's leadership, (Note: As depicted in "Salud".) Jesse Pinkman drives Gus Fring, who is weakened due to taking his own poison, and Mike Ehrmantraut, who is wounded, to a makeshift emergency room that Gus earlier prepared. Gus recovers quickly, but Mike has to stay another week before he can safely travel, so he is left behind in Mexico. Jesse is told that he will take over cooking meth from Walter White, but Jesse insists that Walt must not be harmed. Gus later takes Jesse with him to visit Hector Salamanca. Gus taunts him as the Salamanca lineage has now been destroyed, and shows him Jesse, explaining that Jesse killed Hector's last living descendant, Joaquin.

Later, Hank requests Walt to drive him to the Pollos Hermanos chicken farm that Hank has been planning to investigate, but along the way reveals that he also wants to investigate an industrial laundry owned by the same parent company as Pollos Hermanos—the same laundry that Walt works at. In a panic, Walt deliberately crashes his car, forcing Hank to stop using Walt as his chauffeur.

Meanwhile, Ted appears to blackmail Skyler White about the $617,000 required for paying off the IRS, as Skyler infers that Ted wants more money than she has already given him. Skyler enlists Saul Goodman's men, Huell and Kuby, to extort Ted into paying the IRS. Ted gives in, signing the cheque, but then attempts to escape; he trips, hits his head, and knocks himself out, resulting in a serious injury.

Walt realizes that Jesse has also been cooking in the lab. Walt pleads for them to stick together to thwart Gus, but Jesse, still bitter after their fight, (Note: As depicted in "Bug".) turns his back on Walt. Walt is then abducted and taken out to the desert where Gus fires him and demands he never return to the laundry or speak with Jesse again, and says that his crew will murder Hank due to the risk of Hank's investigations. When Walt protests, Gus threatens to murder Walt's entire family should Walt continue to interfere.

Panicked, Walt barges into Saul's office and takes Saul up on an earlier offer to disappear. (Note: As depicted in "Bullet Points".) Saul tells him since he is a high-risk client he would require the "deluxe service" which in his case will cost a half million dollars since he would need to "disappear" his entire family. Saul hands Walt a business card he has locked in a safe with info for a vacuum cleaner repair business and a phone number to contact the "disappearer" and instructs him what to do. Walt also asks Saul to place an anonymous tip to the DEA warning of a threat to Hank and his family, to which Saul reluctantly agrees. Walter rushes to his house to get the money stored in the crawl space but finds that it is insufficient. Skyler walks in on Walt, and, when Walt asks about the missing money, admits that she gave the money to Ted. Realizing that he and his family are doomed, Walt screams in anguish before breaking down laughing manically when the phone starts ringing in the background. Frightened, Skyler backs away and answers the call from a terrified Marie Schrader, who tells her that the DEA has received an anonymous tip that Hank is a target again by a drug cartel with his life in danger, and the DEA is sending agents to their home to guard him. Walt continues laughing before passing out.

== Analysis ==
Sean Hutchinson of Inverse analyzed the final shot of "Crawl Space", in which the camera pans upwards from Walter laughing in the crawl space. Pulsating music ends with a feedback screech and cut to black. The shot's framing mirrors that of Walt's final scene in the Breaking Bad finale "Felina". Hutchinson viewed it as black comedy, saying that Walt is realizing that he is not in control of the situation. Hutchinson saw the storyline as part of the "open-ended action" that often led to characters appearing to have no way to resolve the situation, but finding a plausible way to do so.

== Reception ==
Bryan Cranston submitted this episode for consideration for the Primetime Emmy Award for Outstanding Lead Actor in a Drama Series for the 64th Primetime Emmy Awards.

=== Critical reception ===
Noel Murray of The A.V. Club awarded the episode an "A", describing it as "intense and terrifying". Seth Amitin of IGN awarded the episode 9 out of 10, praising Cranston's performance as "an amazing piece of acting" and describing the episode as "shocking and eye-brow-raising and fascinating".

Hutchinson praised the final shot and the storylines leading up to it, calling it Breaking Bad's "most underrated moment" and "a perfect bit of mise en scene". In 2019, The Ringer ranked "Crawl Space" as the 9th best of the 62 Breaking Bad episodes.
