= Breaking Bad season 4 =

Fourth season of the AMC crime drama television series

Breaking Bad
- Season 4
- DVD cover
- Showrunner: Vince Gilligan
- Starring: Bryan Cranston; Anna Gunn; Aaron Paul; Dean Norris; Betsy Brandt; RJ Mitte; Bob Odenkirk; Giancarlo Esposito; Jonathan Banks
- No. of episodes: 13

Release
- Original network: AMC
- Original release: July 17 – October 9, 2011

Season chronology
- ← Previous; Season 3 Next → Season 5

The fourth season of the American television drama series Breaking Bad premiered on July 17, 2011 and concluded on October 9, 2011. It consists of 13 episodes, each running approximately 47 minutes in length. AMC broadcast the fourth season on Sundays at 10:00 pm ET in the United States. The complete fourth season was released on Region 1 DVD and Region A Blu-ray on June 5, 2012.

== Cast ==
=== Main ===
- Bryan Cranston as Walter White, a terminally ill man who cooks meth so he can provide for his family.
- Anna Gunn as Skyler White, Walt's wife who helps him launder his drug money.
- Aaron Paul as Jesse Pinkman, Walt's former student who helps him cook meth, and who is dealing with a traumatic event.
- Dean Norris as Hank Schrader, Walt's brother-in-law who is a DEA agent, and is temporarily paraplegic.
- Betsy Brandt as Marie Schrader, Skyler's sister and Hank's kleptomaniac wife.
- RJ Mitte as Walter White, Jr., Walt and Skyler's teenaged son with cerebral palsy.
- Bob Odenkirk as Saul Goodman, Walt's corrupt lawyer who helps him cover his crimes.
- Giancarlo Esposito as Gustavo "Gus" Fring, a drug kingpin and owner of the fictional Los Pollos Hermanos. He is also the distributor of Walt's meth, though their relationship begins to drain.
- Jonathan Banks as Mike Ehrmantraut, Gus' right-hand man and one of Saul's associates.

=== Recurring ===
- Ray Campbell as Tyrus Kitt, one of Gus' henchmen.
- Lavell Crawford as Huell, one of Saul's associates.
- Maurice Compte as Gaff, Don Eladio's right-hand man.
- Steven Michael Quezada as Steven Gomez, Hank's partner at the DEA.
- Emily Rios as Andrea Cantillo, Jesse's girlfriend.
- David Costabile as Gale Boetticher, one of Gus' associates until he was killed by Jesse, he appears in a flashback scene and in a video filmed before his death.
- Christopher Cousins as Ted Beneke, Skyler's old boss who gets into legal trouble with the IRS.
- Nigel Gibbs as APD Detective Tim Roberts, a homicide detective with the Albuquerque Police Department and one of Hank's colleagues.
- Mark Margolis as "Tio" Hector Salamanca, a disabled former cartel kingpin and Gus' arch nemesis.
- Marius Stan as Bogdan Wolynetz, the former owner of the car wash that Walt worked at.
- Michael Shamus Wiles as ASAC George Merkert, the former head of the Albuquerque DEA office, Hank and Steve's former boss.
- Steven Bauer as Don Eladio, the leader of the cartel.
- Bill Burr as Kuby, a con man and one of Saul's associates.
- Tina Parker as Francesca Liddy, Saul's secretary.

=== Guest ===
- Charles Baker as Skinny Pete, one of Jesse's friends.
- Jim Beaver as Lawson, a dealer of illegal arms.
- Jeremiah Bitsui as Victor, Gus' loyal henchman, who is killed by Gus to prove a point to Walt.
- Jere Burns as Group Leader, the leader of a Group Therapy session that Jesse used to attend.
- Javier Grajeda as Juan Bolsa, a major cartel leader that Gus had killed via the Federales, he appears in flashback scenes.
- Matt L. Jones as Badger, one of Jesse's friends.

== Episodes ==
No. overall	No. in season	Title	Directed by	Written by	Original release date	U.S. viewers (millions)
34	1	"Box Cutter"	Adam Bernstein	Vince Gilligan	July 17, 2011	2.58
Walt and Jesse are held in the lab by Victor and Mike, anxiously awaiting Gus' reaction to the murder of Gale. Victor realizes his own position is precarious and reveals he observed Walt and Jesse's work by starting to cook meth himself, hoping to prove his value to Gus. Skyler fears the worst when she cannot contact Walt, while a paranoid Saul hires a personal bodyguard. Hank struggles with life at home after his injury, snapping at Marie and becoming more preoccupied with collecting and cataloging minerals. Gus arrives and, upon seeing Victor cooking, changes into a lab suit and slits Victor's throat with a box cutter. He then changes back to his work clothes and instructs Walt and Jesse to return to work. The following morning, Walt tells Jesse that Gale's death was necessary, but expresses concern that Gus will kill them at his next opportunity. Police investigate Gale's apartment but overlook his lab notes.
35	2	"Thirty-Eight Snub"	Michelle MacLaren	George Mastras	July 24, 2011	1.97
Walt illegally buys and begins carrying a snubnosed revolver to kill Gus, fearing that Gus will eliminate him first. However, Walt receives a visit from Mike and Victor's replacement, Tyrus; Mike coldly informs Walt that he will never see Gus in person again. Jesse, in an attempt to distract himself from having murdered Gale, buys an elaborate stereo system and throws an ongoing party with Badger and Skinny Pete. Andrea visits Jesse and expresses concern for his behavior; Jesse, unable to face his emotions, instead hands her a large stack of cash for Brock's future. Marie struggles with Hank's deepening depression as he continues his physical therapy sessions at home. Skyler pushes forward with her plan to buy the car wash that used to employ Walt, but the resentful owner angrily refuses her offer. Believing Mike to be in as precarious a situation as he and Jesse, Walt follows Mike to a bar and asks to get him in a room with Gus so he can kill him. Instead of answering, Mike beats up Walt and leaves.
36	3	"Open House"	David Slade	Sam Catlin	July 31, 2011	1.71
Walt is furious about a motion-detecting surveillance camera installed in the lab. In a meeting with Saul, Skyler convinces Walt to buy the car wash, and she has Saul's con artist pretend to be an EPA representative who threatens to shut down the business over contaminants. Facing unjust pressure, the owner begrudgingly sells to Skyler, agreeing to an even lower price than her original offer. Jesse continues to open his house up for 24-hour, drug-fueled parties, deliberately throwing piles of money in the midst of the chaos. Frustrated with Hank's coldness at home, Marie renews her kleptomania by stealing items from various real-estate open houses. Marie is eventually caught by a real estate agent and taken into police custody; Hank pulls strings with a former colleague to get her out of being charged. The colleague later seeks Hank's help and gives him a copy of the lab notebook found in Gale's apartment.
37	4	"Bullet Points"	Colin Bucksey	Moira Walley-Beckett	August 7, 2011	1.83
Walt and Skyler plan to tell Hank and Walt Jr. that they paid for Hank's medical bills and the car wash with Walt's illicit gambling winnings; Skyler makes Walt meticulously rehearse their "spontaneous" admission of his problem. Walt is shocked to learn that Hank is investigating Gale's murder; Hank tells Walt that he believes Gale was the cook of the high-grade blue meth, and that Gale was Heisenberg. When asked by Hank to read about a chemical process written in Gale's lab notes, Walt notices a line from a Walt Whitman poem and a dedication: "W. W. My Star, My Perfect Silence." Walt tells Hank that the "W. W." refers to the poet. Jesse's increasing complacency leads to over seventy thousand dollars in cash being stolen from his house, but Mike quickly recovers it. Noticing Jesse's apathy about the loss and recovery, Mike reports to Gus that Jesse's lack of professionalism is a problem for the organization, and that they must intervene. The episode ends with Mike driving an expressionless Jesse to an unknown location.
38	5	"Shotgun"	Michelle MacLaren	Thomas Schnauz	August 14, 2011	1.75
Mike assures Walt that Jesse is safe and he takes Jesse on multiple collections throughout New Mexico. During the last collection, a man appears with a shotgun, and Jesse thwarts the robbery attempt. Later, Gus and Mike discuss the day and it is revealed that the "robbery" was set up by Gus to improve Jesse's low self-esteem. Walt and Skyler officially purchase the car wash, after which Skyler asks Walt to move back into the house. During a family dinner, Hank reveals that he has given up on investigating Gale further, having found a sense of closure in the death of the man he believed to be Heisenberg. When Hank states that Gale was a genius, an intoxicated Walt lets his ego get the better of him, and tells Hank that he believes Gale most likely copied someone else's work and that Hank's "genius" is still at large. The following day, Hank dives back into the case with renewed vigor and discovers a Los Pollos Hermanos napkin amongst Gale's possessions.
39	6	"Cornered"	Michael Slovis	Gennifer Hutchison	August 21, 2011	1.67
Following Walt's behavior at dinner the night before, Skyler grows worried that he is in danger and again pushes Walt to turn himself in. When Walt angrily lashes out and tells her that he is the one who is a danger to others, Skyler leaves with Holly. Walt tells Jesse that Gus is attempting to drive a wedge between him and Jesse, correctly suspecting that the robbery that Jesse thwarted was a set-up. That afternoon, Jesse is again taken from the lab to run a job with Mike; Walt pays three workers at the laundry facility to clean the lab, but when Gus finds out, he has them deported. Meanwhile, Gus compliments Jesse's work in his errands with Mike and proclaims that he "sees something" in him, further boosting Jesse's self-esteem and loyalty. Walt gives into Walt Jr.'s pleas for a new car and buys him a Dodge Challenger. When Skyler returns home, she demands Walt return the car as it contradicts their cover story, further stating that "someone has to protect this family from the man who protects this family".
40	7	"Problem Dog"	Peter Gould	Peter Gould	August 28, 2011	1.91
After hearing Skyler's reasoning, Walt angrily drives the Challenger to a parking lot; he takes it on a joyride, crashes it, and blows it up, forcing Saul to cover up the outburst. Skyler, taken aback by the amount of money Walt makes, is unsure how she will launder all of it through the car wash successfully. Walt convinces Jesse to use his new position as a henchman in the organization to kill Gus, concocting a ricin poison in the lab which Jesse hides in one of his cigarettes. At a meeting, the cartel offers Gus an ultimatum, which he rejects; Jesse has an opportunity to kill Gus, but decides not to. He returns to his 12-step group, where he is kicked out by the group leader after admitting to using the group as a market to peddle meth. Hank visits Los Pollos Hermanos with Walt Jr. and obtains Gus' fingerprints from a cup. Hank later informs Gomez and his boss at the DEA of his investigation that Gus leads a large meth operation, revealing that he has found a match for Gus' fingerprint at Gale's apartment.
41	8	"Hermanos"	Johan Renck	Sam Catlin & George Mastras	September 4, 2011	1.98
In a flashback, Gus visits Hector in a nursing home and informs him of the death of his nephews after their attempt to kill Hank. In the present, Gus is questioned by Hank, the DEA, and the APD; Gus explains that Gale was a recipient of a college scholarship Gus created, and that his fingerprints were in Gale's apartment because Gale had recently invited him over to ask for money. The investigators are satisfied, but Hank remains suspicious. Still believing Gus is a drug kingpin, Hank enlists Walt to plant an illegal tracking device on Gus' car; Walt sees Mike is present and shows Gus the device, but Gus calmly tells him to plant it. Suspecting Jesse is becoming loyal to Gus, Walt again instructs Jesse to poison Gus as soon as possible. Gus visits Hector again, and in another flashback, Gus and his business partner Max meet Hector in 1989, when they approach drug kingpin Don Eladio. Gus and Max offer to produce high-quality meth for Don Eladio, with Max as the cook and Gus as the businessman. At Don Eladio's instruction, Hector shoots and kills Max as a warning to Gus. In the present, Gus hints to Hector that he will one day exact his revenge.
42	9	"Bug"	Terry McDonough	Moira Walley-Beckett & Thomas Schnauz	September 11, 2011	1.89
Ted reveals to Skyler that he is being audited for tax fraud. Worried that she could be implicated as Ted's former bookkeeper, Skyler attends Ted's audit and pretends to be under-qualified and completely ignorant of standard accounting practices. Her supposed incompetence forestalls a full investigation, although Ted is still ordered to pay back his taxes and fines totalling over $600,000. Skyler later ventures into the crawl space underneath her home, where she has been storing Walt's cash. After failing to uncover evidence from the GPS tracker, Hank investigates Gus' depot, forcing Jesse to help clean and move all the product out of it. A cartel sniper opens fire on Gus' distribution center, which ends when Gus walks outside alone; Mike explains to Jesse that the cartel needs to keep Gus alive for his distribution network. Gus calls the cartel and gives in to their demands to split territory, later telling Jesse that he will be sent to Mexico to teach the cartel how to cook the blue meth. Walt confronts Jesse for failing to kill Gus, resulting in a violent fight between the two over their trust issues.
43	10	"Salud"	Michelle MacLaren	Peter Gould & Gennifer Hutchison	September 18, 2011	1.80
Skyler has Saul concoct a story about an inheritance to give Ted enough money to pay off his back taxes. Ted promptly leases a Mercedes and refuses to pay his back taxes, telling Skyler he wants to get his business back up and running first and hire a tax lawyer to try and negotiate a "better deal" with the IRS; Skyler reveals that she was the source of his windfall. Following his fight with Jesse, Walt misses his son's birthday party. Concerned, Walt Jr. pays Walt a visit, only to find him bloodied and incoherent; Walt Jr. stays to take care of his father. The following morning, Walt apologizes for his drugged state, but Walt Jr. responds that he would rather remember Walt that way compared to his behavior the past year. Jesse, Mike, and Gus fly to the cartel's meth lab in Mexico. After a successful cook, Jesse is informed that he now belongs to the cartel. When they go to Don Eladio's estate to celebrate their alliance, Gus kills Don Eladio and his men with poisoned tequila, but he himself is poisoned as well; Mike is shot before Jesse helps them flee the premises.
44	11	"Crawl Space"	Scott Winant	George Mastras & Sam Catlin	September 25, 2011	1.55
Gus survives the poison, and Mike must stay in Mexico for a week to recover. Gus tells Jesse he can run the lab now, but Jesse tells him not to kill Walt. Ted still refuses to pay the IRS with the money from Skyler, who sends Saul's henchmen to intimidate him. Ted signs the check, but then attempts to escape; he trips and hits his head, knocking himself out and breaking his neck. Hoping to stop Hank's investigation into Gus, Walt deliberately gets Hank into a car accident, but Hank is undeterred. Walt realizes Jesse has been cooking without him, but Jesse is unmoved when Walt confronts him and begs him to stop. Gus takes Walt to the desert and fires him, informing him that Hank will be killed and that Walt's entire family will be murdered if he interferes. After convincing Saul to place an anonymous tip to the DEA, Walt desperately prepares to have the family "disappear", but suffers a breakdown when he realizes he does not have enough money because Skyler gave it to Ted. Marie calls Skyler to tell her that the DEA has received an anonymous tip that Hank is a target again, and he is put under protection.
45	12	"End Times"	Vince Gilligan	Thomas Schnauz & Moira Walley-Beckett	October 2, 2011	1.73
Skyler, Walt Jr., and Holly go under DEA protection at Hank and Marie's home. Hank sends Gomez to search the industrial laundromat, but they do not find anything. Gus implies to Jesse that the police attention is Walt's fault, and states that Walt must be killed to protect the operation; Jesse again refuses to cook if Walt is killed. Andrea calls Jesse to the hospital because her son, Brock, is in critical condition with a mysterious flu-like illness. Jesse finds the ricin vial missing and confronts Walt at the latter's barricaded home, suspecting he poisoned Brock. Walt convinces Jesse that Gus is behind the poisoning, as the final manipulation to turn Jesse fully against Walt, and the two agree Gus must be killed. Gus comes to the hospital and demands Jesse return to cook, but Jesse refuses to leave. Walt attempts to kill Gus by planting a homemade bomb under Gus' car, but Gus, sensing danger, abandons the vehicle in the hospital parking garage.
46	13	"Face Off"	Vince Gilligan	Vince Gilligan	October 9, 2011	1.90
Detectives question Jesse about Brock, but Saul intervenes. Afterward, Walt, Jesse, and Saul realize that Gus may be vulnerable via his visits to Hector at the nursing home. Walt visits Hector, who readily agrees to his plan. Jesse is kidnapped from the hospital and held at gunpoint in the lab, forced to cook. Following Walt's plan, Hector asks to speak with the DEA. Believing that Hector is planning to be an informant, Gus visits Hector to personally assassinate him. After Gus admonishes Hector for his supposed cowardice, Hector detonates Walt's bomb, which is strapped underneath his wheelchair; the explosion kills Gus, Tyrus, and himself. Once Gus' death is confirmed, Walt rescues Jesse, and together they destroy the lab. Back at the hospital, Jesse tells Walt that Brock is recovering and that his illness was not caused by ricin, but rather toxic berries from a lily of the valley plant. Still, the two agree that Gus needed to be killed. Skyler calls Walt after seeing news about the nursing home explosion, and he declares to Skyler that he "won". The season ends with a shot of a potted lily of the valley plant in Walt's backyard, revealing that Walt had indeed poisoned Brock.

== Production ==
On June 14, 2010, AMC announced that Breaking Bad was renewed for a fourth, 13-episode season. The writers began brainstorming and writing for the season in early July 2010. At the 2011 Television Critics Association press tour, it was announced production on the season would begin January 13, 2011. Filming ended in mid-June of that year. Although the writing staff knew the fourth season would focus on the feud between Walter White and Gus Fring, they did not plan the season before production began, but rather developed the story as the episodes progressed. This followed a pattern similar to that of the third season and differed distinctly from the second season, where the season was planned in advance. Gilligan compared the fourth season to a "13-episode chess game" between Gus and Walt.

Originally, mini episodes of four minutes in length were to be produced before the premiere of the fourth season but these did not come to fruition. the actor, Bryan Cranston, commented that the season would debut in July 2011 in an interview with New York Magazine, he also said, regarding the premiere date, that "It was a decision from AMC that they wanted to position us in July... They want to attract as many eyeballs as possible, away from the heavy competition of the September, November [or] January start."

== Reception ==
=== Reviews ===
The fourth season of Breaking Bad received universal acclaim from critics, with 96 out of 100 on Metacritic. On review aggregator Rotten Tomatoes, the fourth season has an approval rating of 100% based on 36 reviews, with an average rating of 9.6/10. The site's critics consensus reads: "Breaking Bad's fourth season continues to evolve and subvert expectations, and it's never been more riveting to watch." The Boston Globe referred to the show as a "taut exercise in withheld disaster" and declared the show "riveting". The Pittsburgh Post-Gazette labelled the series "smart and thought provoking that elevates the artistic achievements of the medium". Season four was listed by many critics as one of the best seasons of television in 2011. Time listed Walter White's "I am the one who knocks" line as one of the best television lines of 2011. The Pittsburgh Post-Gazette listed it as the best series of 2011 while noting that, "Breaking Bad is that rare TV series that has never made a seriously damaging storytelling misstep." The A.V. Club's review of the finale summed it up as a "fantastically fitting end for a season that ran in slow motion, starting and continuing with so many crises begging for resolution week after week. Now the decks are cleared, but that doesn't mean anybody is home free. Nothing's ever easy on Breaking Bad." The reviewer continued to exalt the season, and proclaimed, "What a season of television — truly something none of us could ever have expected, or claimed we deserved." Best-selling author Noah Charney called it "the best show on television" and compared it to great works of literature for its three-dimensional characters and combination of action, drama, and dark comedy.

=== Awards and nominations ===
The fourth season received numerous awards and nominations, including 13 Primetime Emmy Award nominations. Aaron Paul won the only award for the series, winning for Outstanding Supporting Actor in a Drama Series. Its nominations included Outstanding Drama Series, Bryan Cranston for Outstanding Lead Actor in a Drama Series, Giancarlo Esposito for Outstanding Supporting Actor in a Drama Series, Anna Gunn for Outstanding Supporting Actress in a Drama Series, Mark Margolis for Outstanding Guest Actor in a Drama Series, Vince Gilligan for Outstanding Directing for a Drama Series ("Face Off"), Michael Slovis for Outstanding Cinematography for a One Hour Series ("Face Off"), and Kelley Dixon and Skip Macdonald each for Outstanding Single-Camera Picture Editing for a Drama Series ("End Times" and "Face Off"). "Face Off" was also nominated for Outstanding Sound Editing, Outstanding Sound Mixing, and Outstanding Special Visual Effects in a Supporting Role.

Bryan Cranston received his second consecutive Golden Globe Award nomination for Best Actor in a Drama Series. Cranston was also nominated for Outstanding Performance by a Male Actor in a Drama Series for the Screen Actors Guild Award, with the series nominated for Outstanding Performance by an Ensemble in a Drama Series.

Vince Gilligan received his first nomination for a Directors Guild of America Award for Outstanding Directing – Drama Series for "Face Off". The series earned three nominations for the Writers Guild of America Awards, winning two; Best Drama Series and Best Episodic Drama ("Box Cutter").

At the 28th TCA Awards, the series was nominated for three awards, including Program of the Year, Outstanding Achievement in Drama, and Individual Achievement in Drama (Cranston). It went on to win Outstanding Achievement in Drama.

For the 2nd Critics' Choice Television Awards, the series received five nominations for Best Drama Series, Best Actor in a Drama Series (Cranston), Best Supporting Actor in a Drama Series (Giancarlo Esposito and Aaron Paul), and Best Supporting Actress in a Drama Series (Anna Gunn), winning two; Best Actor in a Drama Series (Cranston) and Best Supporting Actor in a Drama Series (Esposito).

The series also received two Satellite Award nominations for Best Drama Series and Best Actor in a Drama Series (Cranston), along with six Saturn Award nominations, including Best Syndicated/Cable Television Series, Best Actor on Television (Cranston), Best Supporting Actor on Television (Esposito and Paul), and Best Guest Performer on Television (Steven Bauer and Mark Margolis), winning three; Best Syndicated/Cable Television Series, Best Actor on Television (Cranston), and Best Supporting Actor on Television (Paul).

Kelley Dixon and Skip Macdonald were each nominated for an Eddie Award for Best Edited One-Hour Series for Commercial Television. Dixon was nominated for "End Times" and MacDonald was nominated for "Face Off". MacDonald went on to win the award.

== Home media ==
The fourth season was released on DVD in Region 1 and on Blu-ray on June 5, 2012.

Special Features Include:

- Uncensored Episodes
- Deleted and Extended Scenes
- Cast & Crew Commentaries on All 13 Episodes
- Gag Reel
- 30 Featurettes
- "Better Call Saul" Commercials
- Karaoke Video Featuring Gale Boetticher
- 13 Video Podcasts, with a Total Run Time of More than Two Hours (exclusive to the Blu-ray)
