= Salud (Breaking Bad) =

- Breaking Bad episode
- Episode no.: Season 4 Episode 10
- Directed by: Michelle MacLaren
- Written by: Peter Gould; Gennifer Hutchison
- Cinematography by: Michael Slovis
- Editing by: Kelley Dixon
- Original air date: September 18, 2011
- Running time: 47 minutes

Guest appearances
- Christopher Cousins as Ted Beneke; Maurice Compte as Gaff; Carlo Rota as Benicio Fuentes; Ray Campbell as Tyrus Kitt; Tina Parker as Francesca Liddy; Steven Bauer as Don Eladio Vuente

Episode chronology
← Previous "Bug"	Next → "Crawl Space"
- Breaking Bad season 4

"Salud" (Spanish for 'Health', used in the context of "cheers") is the tenth episode of the fourth season of the American television drama series Breaking Bad and the 43rd overall episode of the series. It originally aired on AMC in the United States on September 18, 2011.

== Plot ==
Jesse Pinkman, Mike Ehrmantraut and Gus Fring travel to Mexico to teach the Cartel how to cook meth with a purity level over 90 percent. Although the cartel's chief chemist is initially skeptical because Jesse lacks scientific knowledge, the cartel is impressed when Jesse cooks a batch with 96% purity. Jesse is then horrified to hear that he belongs to the cartel, although Mike assures him that he will be returning home.

As a result of his fight with Jesse the previous night, (Note: As depicted in "Bug".) Walt misses his son's birthday. Concerned, Walter Jr. pays him a visit, only to find him bloodied. Walt blames it on gambling and tearfully apologizes before Walt Jr. helps his father into bed. Walt sleepily asks his son about his birthday before referring to Walt Jr. as Jesse. The next morning, Walt finds Walt Jr. on his couch and apologizes for his drugged state, saying he does not want to be remembered that way after he has gone. However, Walt Jr. responds that he would rather remember Walt that way compared to his behavior the past year.

Skyler White convinces Saul Goodman to transfer $620,000 in cash to Ted Beneke under the false story of an inheritance from a distant aunt. Instead of paying off the IRS, Ted uses the money to lease a new Mercedes Benz SL550 and restart his business, forcing Skyler to tell him that the money actually came from her.

Jesse, Mike, and Gus are brought to Don Eladio's residence where Hector killed Gus's partner Max decades earlier. (Note: As depicted in "Hermanos".) Gus and Eladio make peace, capped off with a bottle of rare tequila from Gus. Gus, who took some pills earlier, drinks the tequila to assuage Eladio's concerns, but prevents Jesse from drinking any. As Eladio and his henchmen party, Gus goes to the bathroom and induces himself to vomit; the tequila was poisoned, and all of the bosses begin to die as they drank it. Despite the pills and the induced vomit, Gus is nevertheless affected, and his body begins failing as he tells the surviving henchmen that Eladio and his men are dead and they therefore no longer have a reason to fight. Most remaining cartel soldiers flee, but Joaquin Salamanca shoots and wounds Mike before being shot and killed by Jesse. Jesse then drives Mike and Gus and the trio flee the premises.

== Production ==
The tequila bottle offered from Gus Fring to Don Eladio is from the fictional brand Zafiro Añejo. This particular brand and bottle design is later used in several episodes of the spin-off show Better Call Saul.

== Reception ==
Seth Amitin of IGN gave the episode a 10/10 ("Masterpiece") rating. Donna Bowman of The A.V. Club gave it an A− grade.

In 2019 The Ringer ranked "Salud" as the 20th best out of the 62 total Breaking Bad episodes.
