= Shotgun (Breaking Bad) =

- Breaking Bad episode
- Episode no.: Season 4 Episode 5
- Directed by: Michelle MacLaren
- Written by: Thomas Schnauz
- Cinematography by: Nelson Cragg
- Editing by: Skip Macdonald
- Original air date: August 14, 2011
- Running time: 47 minutes

Guest appearances
- Nigel Gibbs as Tim Roberts; Ray Campbell as Tyrus Kitt

Episode chronology
← Previous "Bullet Points"	Next → "Cornered"
- Breaking Bad season 4

"Shotgun" is the fifth episode of the fourth season of the American television drama series Breaking Bad, and the 38th overall episode of the series. It originally aired on AMC in the United States on August 14, 2011.

== Plot ==
Walter White is racing to Los Pollos Hermanos to confront Gus Fring about Jesse Pinkman's disappearance. Worried about what will happen, Walter leaves a voicemail for Skyler White and his children, saying only that he loves them. Walt learns that Gus is not in, and Mike Ehrmantraut eventually calls, explaining that Jesse is with him and will not be harmed, and telling Walt to go back to work.

Over the course of the day, Mike drives Jesse to seven isolated dead drops all over New Mexico, where Gus's dealers leave drug money for pickup. Jesse assumes he was brought along to watch Mike's back, but Mike angrily denies this after being asked repeatedly. He insists he doesn't know why he was asked to take Jesse to the mission. While waiting in the car alone at the last dead drop spot, Jesse notices two robbers approaching, one armed with a shotgun. He slams the car in reverse, rams into their car, and drives off. When Jesse returns, Mike hints that he is impressed. It is later revealed that Gus set up the entire scene to increase Jesse's low self-esteem and motivate him.

Meanwhile, Walt and Skyler officially buy the car wash. After Skyler hears the voicemail Walt left earlier, the two have sex and she offers to let Walter move back in, but Walter leaves for the lab without giving an answer. Jesse has returned to the lab and explains to Walt that he will be working in the lab and also helping Mike with pickups from now on. Later back home, Walter Jr. excitedly reveals to Walt that Skyler already set the date for Walt to move back in, which seems to unnerve him.

During dinner at Hank and Marie Schrader's, a brooding Walt gets increasingly tipsy on wine. Hank explains that he gave up investigating Gale further, having found a sense of closure in the death of the man he believed to be Heisenberg, but lauds Gale's genius. A prideful Walt then insists that Gale was not a genius, and suggests that he was copying someone else's work. This convinces Hank to take another look at the case files, and he notices that the strictly vegan Gale had notes scribbled on a napkin from Los Pollos Hermanos.

== Reception ==
Matt Richenthal of TV Fanatic awarded the episode 4.5 out of 5. Donna Bowman reviewing for The A.V. Club gave the episode a "B+". Seth Amitin reviewing for IGN awarded the episode 7.5 out of 10, the lowest score for any episode in the series and the only episode with a score of less than 8.

In 2019, The Ringer ranked "Shotgun" 60th out of 62 total Breaking Bad episodes.
