= Face Off (Breaking Bad) =

- Breaking Bad episode
- After an explosion, half of Gus Fring's face is blown off. The visual effects in this scene earned the episode an Emmy nomination for Outstanding Special Visual Effects.
- Episode no.: Season 4 Episode 13
- Directed by: Vince Gilligan
- Written by: Vince Gilligan
- Cinematography by: Michael Slovis
- Editing by: Skip Macdonald
- Original air date: October 9, 2011
- Running time: 50 minutes

Guest appearances
- Mark Margolis as Hector Salamanca; Steven Michael Quezada as Steven Gomez; Michael Shamus Wiles as George Merkert; Ray Campbell as Tyrus Kitt; Myra Turley as Hector's caregiver; Gonzalo Menendez as Detective Kalanchoe; Tina Parker as Francesca Liddy; Jason Douglas as Detective Munn; Christopher King as Chris Mara; Gail Gilligan as Rebecca Simmons

Episode chronology
| ← Previous "End Times" | Next → "Live Free or Die" |
- Breaking Bad season 4

"Face Off" is the thirteenth episode and season finale of the fourth season of the American television drama Breaking Bad, and the 46th overall episode of the series. It originally aired on AMC in the United States on October 9, 2011. It was directed and written by series creator and executive producer Vince Gilligan.

The episode marks the culmination of the arc concerning the conflict between Walter White (Bryan Cranston) and Gus Fring (Giancarlo Esposito), which served as the focus of the fourth season. The episode marks Esposito's final appearance in the series as Fring, as well as the final appearances of recurring characters Hector Salamanca and Tyrus Kitt, played by Mark Margolis and Ray Campbell, respectively. All three would reprise their roles in the Breaking Bad prequel series Better Call Saul.

The episode was named by TV Guide as one of the best television episodes of 2011.

== Plot ==
Walter White removes the bomb from Gus Fring's car and asks Jesse Pinkman if he knows of a place Gus frequents that does not have security cameras and is not well-guarded. Before Jesse can think of one, he is approached and interrogated by two detectives concerned about his knowledge of ricin. When Saul Goodman arrives as Jesse's lawyer, Jesse tells him of a potential location: Hector Salamanca's retirement home, Casa Tranquila.

Walt visits Hector and offers him a truce via an opportunity to kill Gus as revenge for wiping out the Salamanca family. Hector asks to speak with the DEA but rather than disclosing anything, simply insults them (by spelling out S-U-C-K-M-Y and F-U-C on a letter board). Just as planned, Gus believes Hector is going to the DEA to be an informant; Gus visits Hector to personally assassinate him. Tyrus Kitt inspects Hector's retirement home room for any bugs and finds nothing. Gus enters and admonishes Hector for his supposed cowardice, and prepares to kill him via lethal injection; however, Hector furiously looks up at Gus for the first time in years, leaving Gus shocked. Hector repeatedly rings his bell, detonating Walt's bomb, which is hidden underneath his wheelchair; the explosion kills Hector and Tyrus, and Gus walks out of the room with his face half blown off before collapsing dead on the floor.

Walt hears the news of the explosion on the radio and is relieved. Jesse is released from police custody but is kidnapped and forced to cook meth at the lab at gunpoint. Walt heads to the lab, kills Gus's two henchmen stationed there, and frees Jesse. Knowing that Hank Schrader is closing in on the lab, Walt and Jesse burn it down.

Later on the top floor of the hospital parking garage, Jesse tells Walt that Brock Cantillo will live and that he was poisoned by lily of the valley berries, which children sometimes eat because of their sweet taste. Although Jesse questions killing Gus, since Gus never poisoned Brock after all, Walt assures Jesse that it had to be done. Walt calls Skyler White, who is—along with the rest of the family, still under lockdown (Note: The DEA-imposed lockdown of Hank and Marie Schrader from the cartel that began in "Crawl Space")—learning of the explosion from the news. Skyler asks Walt if he had caused the explosion and what happened, to which he simply replies, "I won". As Walt drives down from the top floor of the hospital parking garage, he passes Gus' still abandoned Volvo station wagon (with the Pollos Hermanos logo hanging from the rear view mirror) from his previous aborted attempt to kill Gus. (Note: As depicted in "End Times") The episode ends with a shot of a lily of the valley plant in Walt's backyard, revealing that it was Walt who had poisoned Brock.

== Production ==
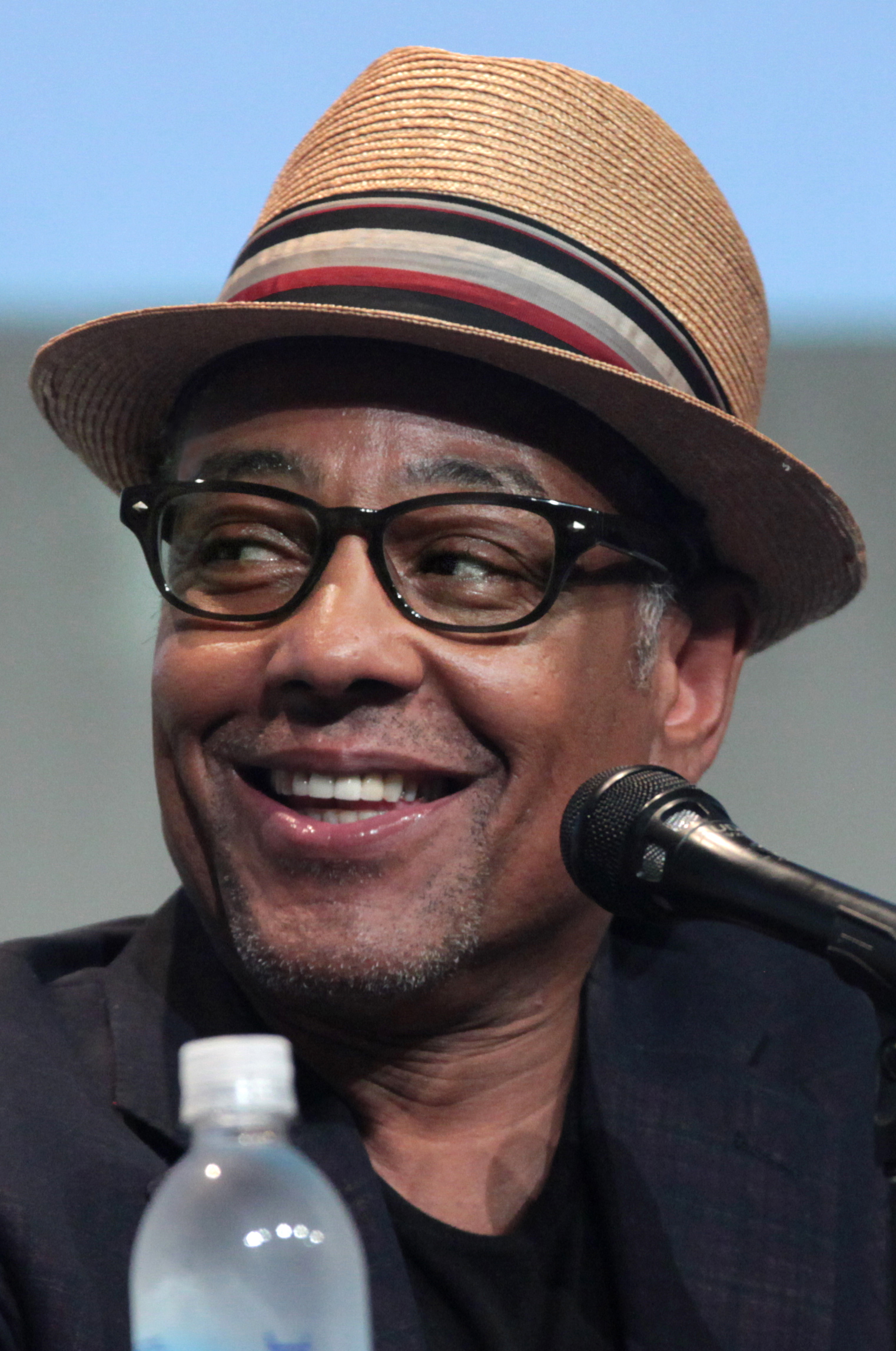
Giancarlo Esposito made his final appearance as Gus Fring in Breaking Bad before reprising the role in Better Call Saul.

The episode was written and directed by the series creator Vince Gilligan. It marked Gilligan's final directorial credit on the series before the series finale.

This episode marks the final appearance in the series of Giancarlo Esposito as Gus Fring, and recurring actors Mark Margolis as Hector Salamanca and Ray Campbell as Tyrus Kitt. Esposito, Campbell and Margolis would reprise their respective roles in Breaking Bad's spin-off series Better Call Saul: Margolis from the show's second season, and Esposito and Campbell from the third.

The plot wrapup was planned by the series' production team since the beginning of the season, partly because they were not certain at the time whether the series was going to be renewed for another season. The visual effect of Gus's massive facial wounds took months to prepare, with assistance from Greg Nicotero and the special effects team from fellow AMC drama The Walking Dead. The effect was produced using elaborate makeup on Esposito's face, with additional computer-generated imagery that combined two separate shots. The episode's title is a double entendre in that "Face Off" is a reference to Gus losing half of his face in the explosion, and also is a term to describe a battle or confrontation.

The songs playing throughout the episode were "Black" by Danger Mouse and Daniele Luppi featuring Norah Jones, "Goodbye" by Apparat, and "Freestyle" by Taalbi Brothers. The use of all three songs was praised as among the series' greatest musical choices by Uproxx, while Complex specifically named "Black" on a similar list.

== Reception ==
=== Critical reception ===
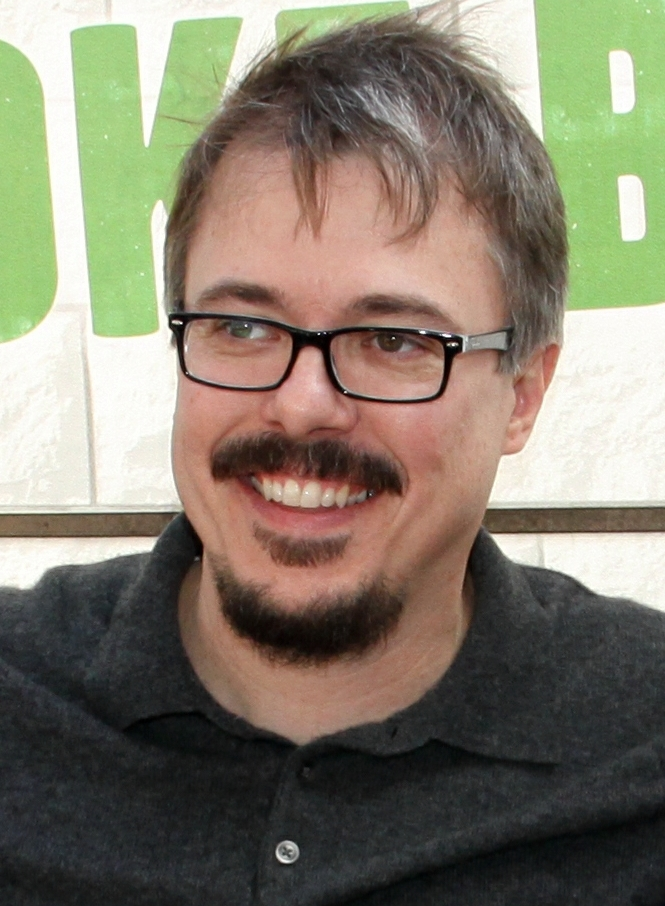
Vince Gilligan received acclaim for his direction and writing of the episode.

Seth Amitin of IGN awarded the episode 9.5 out of 10, describing it as "the perfect blend of Breaking Bad". Alan Sepinwall, reviewing for HitFix, said the episode was "fantastic, from beginning to end". Matt Richenthal of TV Fanatic awarded the episode a 4.8 out of 5 and described Breaking Bad as "the best show on television". Donna Bowman of The A.V. Club awarded the episode an "A". James Poniewozik of Time magazine described the finale as "stunning, morally searing and, well, explosive ... with a few holy-crap moments for the ages", while Tim Goodman of The Hollywood Reporter reckoned that the episode "did a lot of things right, course-correcting most ... worries and giving viewers not only an action-packed, satisfying episode but putting the show on the path to finish ... in a nearly perfect dramatic state."

In 2019, The Ringer ranked "Face Off" as the 3rd best out of the 62 Breaking Bad episodes.

=== Awards ===
The episode was nominated for seven Primetime Emmy Awards at the 64th ceremony: Outstanding Directing for a Drama Series for Vince Gilligan; Outstanding Cinematography for a Single-Camera Series; Outstanding Single-Camera Picture Editing for a Drama Series and Outstanding Sound Mixing for a Comedy or Drama Series (One-Hour); Outstanding Guest Actor in a Drama Series for Mark Margolis; Outstanding Sound Editing for a Series and Outstanding Special Visual Effects in a Supporting Role. Editor Skip Macdonald won the ACE Eddie Award for Best Edited One-Hour Series for Commercial Television for this episode. Gilligan won the Directors Guild of America Award for Best Directing in a Drama Series and received a nomination to Writers Guild of America Award for best episodic drama. The episode also received nominations for Outstanding Achievement in Sound Mixing for Television Series at the Cinema Audio Society Awards; Best Sound Editing in Television – Short Form: Sound Effects and Foley at the Golden Reel Awards; and Outstanding Supporting Visual Effects in a Broadcast Program at the Visual Effects Society Awards.
