= Mandala (Breaking Bad) =

- Breaking Bad episode
- Walter White and Gus Fring meet for the first time
- Episode no.: Season 2 Episode 11
- Directed by: Adam Bernstein
- Written by: George Mastras
- Cinematography by: Michael Slovis
- Editing by: Skip Macdonald
- Original air date: May 17, 2009
- Running time: 47 minutes

Guest appearances
- Bob Odenkirk as Saul Goodman; Giancarlo Esposito as Gus Fring; Krysten Ritter as Jane Margolis; Christopher Cousins as Ted Beneke; Sam McMurray as Dr. Victor Bravenec; Charles Baker as Skinny Pete; Rodney Rush as Combo Ortega; David House as Dr. Delcavoli; Angelo Martinez as Tomas Cantillo; Jeremiah Bitsui as Victor

Episode chronology
← Previous "Over"	Next → "Phoenix"
- Breaking Bad season 2

"Mandala" is the eleventh episode of the second season of the American television drama series Breaking Bad. It was written by George Mastras and directed by Adam Bernstein. The episode aired on AMC on May 17, 2009. This episode introduces Gus Fring and Victor, played by Giancarlo Esposito and Jeremiah Bitsui respectively.

== Plot ==
Combo Ortega is selling drugs on a street corner outside Heisenberg's territory when he notices two rival dealers staring him down; he is then killed by a young boy working for them. Skinny Pete, spooked by Combo's death and Badger's recent brush with the law, decides to quit the drug trade. With no distribution network, Walter White and Jesse Pinkman are forced to look elsewhere. They meet with Saul Goodman to discuss their next move. He tells them that they are incompetent distributors, and need a businessman who will buy their product in bulk. He offers to reach out to the only distributor of that kind he has heard of, but it will be difficult, as the man is extremely cautious. Jesse is distraught that he got Combo killed, and that night tells Jane Margolis to leave his apartment so that he does not harm her recovery when he smokes meth. Jane reluctantly decides to stay with him.

The next day, Walt waits at a local chicken restaurant called Los Pollos Hermanos, where the distributor has arranged to meet them; Jesse comes in late, still high, and leaves quickly afterward. Nobody talks to Walt, but he realizes later that the distributor saw him and has refused to work with him. Meanwhile, Jane relapses into drug addiction and introduces Jesse to heroin. The next day, Walt goes back to the restaurant and waits until closing time. He eventually realizes that the man he assumes is the restaurant manager is the distributor. Although the distributor maintains he is unwilling to work with a drug addict, Walt assures him that Jesse can be relied on and that their product is the best. The distributor tells Walt that he will be in touch if he decides to work with the duo, and warns Walt never to trust a drug addict.

Skyler White helps the company celebrate her boss Ted Beneke's birthday, where she sings him a sultry version of "Happy Birthday, Mr. President". She later finds, while investigating the accounts, that there are many inaccuracies in the payments to the company. Ted admits that he has evaded taxation on millions of dollars by under-reporting revenue to keep the company afloat and support its employees. Skyler says that while she will not turn him in, she cannot be a part of his illegal doings and quits. However, she returns to work the next day, conflicted.

Walt gets a message telling him to come to the restaurant, where he learns that the distributor is not the restaurant manager but the owner of the Los Pollos Hermanos chain of restaurants, Gus Fring. The actual manager, who appears oblivious to Gus's criminal activities, tells Walt that Gus is not currently at the store. Just as Walt is about to leave, an associate of Gus named Victor blocks him from exiting and tells him to deliver the meth to a truck stop within the next hour in exchange for $1.2 million cash, adding that if he does not do so, Gus will never do future business with him. Walt rushes to Jesse's apartment and breaks in while Jesse and Jane are in a heroin-induced haze to retrieve the meth. At the same time, Skyler goes into labor and texts Walt when he does not pick up his phone. Walt takes a moment to consider his choice before gathering the meth and leaving the house.

== Critical reception ==
Seth Amitin, of IGN, gave the episode an 8.6/10, commenting the episode was: "about crossing the lines..." and that it "is the beginning of the set-up for the finale in two weeks". Donna Bowman of The A.V. Club gave the episode a B, writing that "it's inevitable that we'd have a merely good episode at some point" and, like Amitin, thought that the episode "seemed to be mostly concerned with moving the pieces into place for the finale".

In 2019, The Ringer ranked "Mandala" 46th out of the 62 total Breaking Bad episodes. Vulture ranked it 47th overall.
