= Hermanos (Breaking Bad) =

- Breaking Bad episode
- Episode no.: Season 4 Episode 8
- Directed by: Johan Renck
- Written by: Sam Catlin; George Mastras
- Cinematography by: Michael Slovis
- Editing by: Kelley Dixon
- Original air date: September 4, 2011
- Running time: 47 minutes

Guest appearances
- Mark Margolis as Hector Salamanca; Steven Michael Quezada as Steven Gomez; Emily Rios as Andrea Cantillo; Michael Shamus Wiles as George Merkert; Javier Grajeda as Juan Bolsa; Nigel Gibbs as Tim Roberts; James Martinez as Maximino Arciniega; Lavell Crawford as Huell Babineaux; Ian Posada as Brock Cantillo; Steven Bauer as Don Eladio Vuente

Episode chronology
← Previous "Problem Dog"	Next → "Bug"
- Breaking Bad season 4

"Hermanos" (Spanish for 'Brothers') is the eighth episode of the fourth season of the American television drama series Breaking Bad, and the 41st overall episode of the series. It originally aired on AMC in the United States on September 4, 2011.

== Plot ==
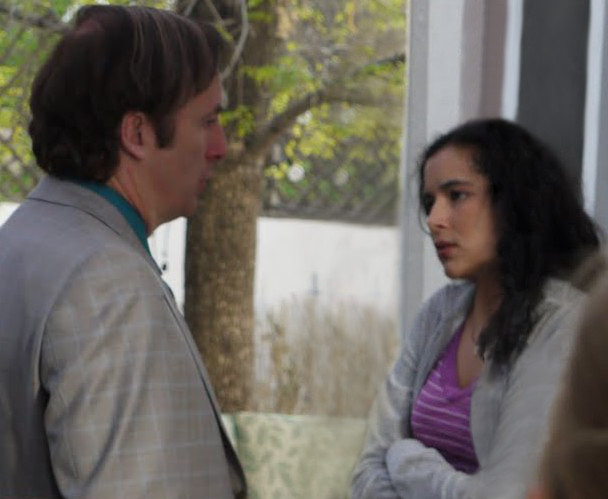
Bob Odenkirk as Saul Goodman and Emily Rios as Andrea Cantillo

During a flashback, Gus Fring hints to Hector Salamanca that he orchestrated the deaths of Leonel and Marco Salamanca and Juan Bolsa.

In the present, Gus meets with the police and DEA and is told that his fingerprints were found at the scene of a homicide. Gus surmises that the crime at issue is the killing of Gale Boetticher. Gus then explains that Gale was a recipient of a University of New Mexico college scholarship in chemistry Gus created, and that his fingerprints were in Gale's apartment because Gale has recently invited him over and asked for money. Hank Schrader asks if "Gustavo Fring" is his real name, as there are no records of it in his native Chile. Gus says the Pinochet dictatorship kept poor records. The investigators are satisfied, but Hank remains suspicious. Skyler White begins to hide Walter White's money in a crawl space below the house.

Hank asks Walter to drive him to a mineral show, but reveals en route that he is really going to Los Pollos Hermanos to plant a GPS tracker on Gus's car. Walter pretends to plant it and goes inside, where he assures Gus that he did not emplace it. Gus tells him to do it, so Walt plants the tracker on his way back to his car. Walt warns Jesse Pinkman about Hank's investigation and again urges him to kill Gus. While at Jesse's house, Walt intercepts a text message meant for Jesse and suspects Jesse is becoming loyal to Gus.

Gus visits Hector in the nursing home. A flashback shows Gus and Max meeting with Hector, Bolsa, and Don Eladio. Gus and Max pitch their meth scheme to Eladio. Max, a chemical engineer, produces the meth, and Max and Gus sell it out of their restaurant, Los Pollos Hermanos. Eladio feels Gus was disrespectful by giving meth "samples" to Eladio's henchmen in order to manipulate Eladio into a meeting. Hector shoots Max through the head and forces Gus to look him in the eyes as he bleeds into Eladio's swimming pool. Eladio tells Gus the only reason he is still alive is because Eladio knows who he really is, and warns him that he is "not in Chile anymore."

In the present, Gus tells Hector to look him in the eyes, but Hector refuses. "Maybe next time," Gus says before departing.

== Production ==
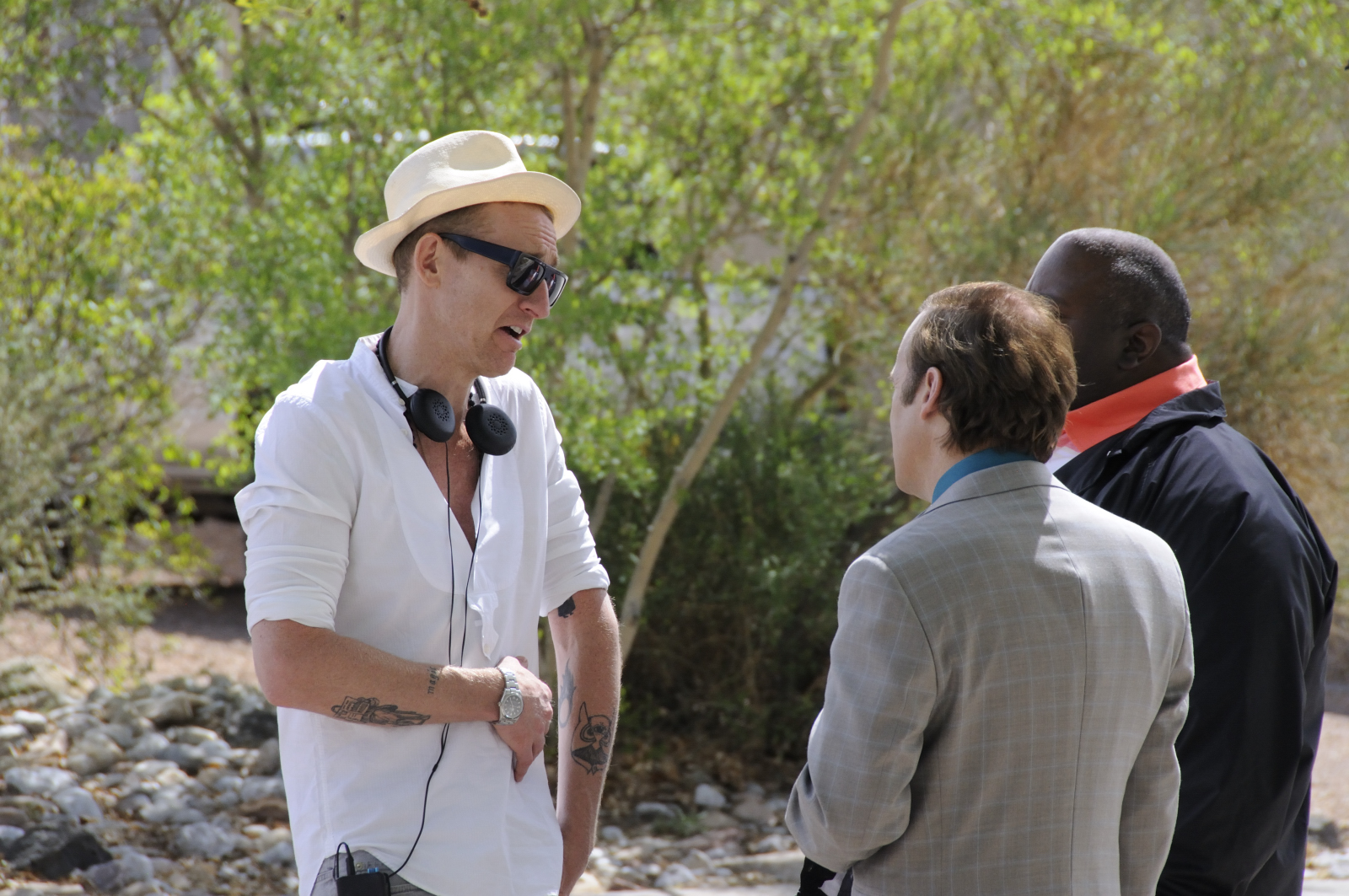
Director Johan Renck, Bob Odenkirk (as Saul Goodman) and Lavell Crawford (as Huell Babineaux) on the Breaking Bad set

"Hermanos" was the first episode to delve into Gus Fring's backstory, although much remains unexplained about the character's past in Chile, which Gus seems anxious to keep concealed. Series creator Vince Gilligan has said Gus was likely involved in the military dictatorship of General Augusto Pinochet, but the writing staff had deliberately not determined the entire backstory. Gilligan said he believed this would make Gus a more interesting and mysterious character, while simultaneously allowing the writers greater flexibility in writing for him in future episodes.

== Reception ==
Alan Sepinwall of HitFix praised the episode, describing it as "another superb hour of season 4". Seth Amitin of IGN gave it a rare 10 out of 10. Donna Bowman of The A.V. Club gave the episode a "B+".

In 2019, The Ringer ranked "Hermanos" as the 16th best out of the 62 total Breaking Bad episodes.

=== Accolades ===
At the 64th Primetime Emmy Awards, Giancarlo Esposito submitted this episode for consideration to support his Outstanding Supporting Actor in a Drama Series nomination. He ultimately lost to Aaron Paul for his performance in the episode "End Times".
