= Bug (Breaking Bad) =

- Breaking Bad episode
- Episode no.: Season 4 Episode 9
- Directed by: Terry McDonough
- Written by: Moira Walley-Beckett; Thomas Schnauz
- Cinematography by: Michael Slovis
- Editing by: Skip Macdonald
- Original air date: September 11, 2011
- Running time: 47 minutes

Guest appearances
- Christopher Cousins as Ted Beneke; Maurice Compte as Gaff; Rob Brownstein as James Picarus; Ray Campbell as Tyrus Kitt; Christopher King as Chris Mara

Episode chronology
← Previous "Hermanos"	Next → "Salud"
- Breaking Bad season 4

"Bug" is the ninth episode of the fourth season of the American television drama series Breaking Bad, and the 42nd overall episode of the series. It originally aired on AMC in the United States on September 11, 2011.

== Plot ==
Hank Schrader retrieves the GPS tracker from Gus Fring's car. Disappointed that it recorded nothing suspicious, he investigates Gus's distribution center. Walter White warns Mike Ehrmantraut. Walter later meets with Jesse Pinkman and again expresses dissatisfaction that Jesse has not killed Gus.

Skyler White tells Walter the car wash is doing so well that he may be able to quit cooking meth. Ted Beneke tells Skyler he is being audited for tax fraud. As his former bookkeeper, since she was aware of the fraud, Skyler could also be implicated. She attends Ted's audit and pretends to be underqualified and completely ignorant of accounting practices. Believing the fraud was not intentional, the investigator agrees not to seek prison time, but still orders Ted to pay back taxes and fines totaling $600,000. Skyler ventures into the crawl space underneath the White's home, where she has been storing Walt's cash. Walter sees Tyrus Kitt outside Hank's house and reports him to police, forcing Tyrus to leave.

A cartel sniper opens fire on Gus's distribution center, killing one of Gus's employees, which ends when Gus walks outside alone and stands in the line of fire. Mike later explains to Jesse that the cartel needs to keep Gus alive for his distribution network. They dissolve the dead employee's body in acid and Mike threatens to kill Walt if he ever again calls the police on Mike's people. Gus invites Jesse to his home and asks him if he is capable of cooking alone, but Jesse angrily reveals that he is aware of Gus' scheme to make him feel independent from Walter; he says that if Gus kills Walter, he will have to kill Jesse as well. Gus denies this and tells Jesse that he has given in to the cartel's demands to split territory; he asked if Jesse can work alone so he can go to Mexico to teach them how to cook the blue meth. Jesse has an opportunity to poison the stew that Gus makes but decides not to risk it.

Jesse tells Walt he is supposed to teach the cartel how to produce meth and asks for a tutorial so he can explain the chemistry, but does not reveal the meeting with Gus. Walt reveals that he put a GPS tracker on Jesse's car, so he knew that Jesse was at Gus's house. Walt confronts Jesse for failing to kill Gus, but Jesse throws the GPS tracker at Walt's head. Walt and Jesse engage in a brutal fight and wreck the living room before Jesse gains the upper hand. Jesse tells Walt to leave his house and never return.

== Production ==
"Bug" is the last episode of the series to feature the Los Pollos Hermanos restaurant. The restaurant was used many times as an important plot device for its owner Gustavo Fring. The restaurant would not be used again until the third season of Better Call Saul ("Witness").

== Reception ==
Donna Bowman of The A.V. Club gave the episode a "B+". She said several Rubicons are crossed, including "three enormous, no-going-back decisions" three of the characters have to make.

In 2019 The Ringer ranked "Bug" 61st out of 62 total Breaking Bad episodes.
