= End Times (Breaking Bad) =

- Breaking Bad episode
- Episode no.: Season 4 Episode 12
- Directed by: Vince Gilligan
- Written by: Moira Walley-Beckett; Thomas Schnauz
- Cinematography by: Michael Slovis
- Editing by: Kelley Dixon
- Original air date: October 2, 2011
- Running time: 46 minutes

Guest appearances
- Steven Michael Quezada as Steven Gomez; Emily Rios as Andrea Cantillo; Ray Campbell as Tyrus Kitt; Mike Batayeh as Dennis Markowsky; Lavell Crawford as Huell Babineaux; Tina Parker as Francesca Liddy; Ian Posada as Brock Cantillo; Christopher King as Chris Mara

Episode chronology
← Previous "Crawl Space"	Next → "Face Off"
- Breaking Bad season 4

"End Times" is the twelfth and penultimate episode of the fourth season of the American television drama series Breaking Bad, and the 45th overall episode of the series. It originally aired on AMC in the United States on October 2, 2011. GQ and Salon.com named "End Times" as one of the best television episodes of 2011.

== Plot ==
After receiving an anonymous warning from Saul Goodman about Hank Schrader having been targeted by a drug cartel, the DEA dispatches a squad of agents to guard Hank and Marie Schrader's house. The White family is also brought to the Schrader household for protection, but Walter White tells Skyler White that he will stay behind at their own house, ready to face the consequences of his actions. Hank deduces that his investigation of Gus Fring is the reason for the threat on his life, so he asks Steven Gomez to search the industrial laundromat for him.

Gomez and an officer with a drug-sniffing dog later check out the laundromat but do not find anything, although Jesse Pinkman and Tyrus Kitt were below them in the hidden meth lab. Gus, in a phone call to Jesse, implies the police attention is Walter's fault, and Walter must be killed to protect the operation, but Jesse again refuses to cook if Walter is killed. Saul later hands Jesse's entire share of the meth profits to Jesse, since Saul is planning to temporarily flee Albuquerque until the feud between Walter and Gus is over. Saul reveals that Gus took Walter to the desert and threatened his family, a revelation by which Jesse is taken aback. Jesse later receives a call from Andrea Cantillo that her son, Brock Cantillo, has become seriously ill and is in the hospital. Jesse discovers that the ricin cigarette, which he kept handy to poison Gus, is missing and concludes that Brock somehow ingested the ricin.

Jesse confronts a paranoid Walter at the Whites' house, where he grabs Walter's gun and points it at him, accusing him of poisoning Brock out of spite. Walter claims that Gus must have planned Brock's poisoning and framed Walter for it in order to manipulate Jesse into killing him, speculating that the cameras around the lab probably spotted the cigarette, and Tyrus must have taken it out of Jesse's locker, tracked down Brock, and poisoned him. Walter and Jesse know Gus is not above killing children, after the death of Andrea's younger brother, Tomás Cantillo, and Jesse ultimately decides that Walter is innocent. The two team up to kill Gus.

Jesse visits the hospital daily, but Andrea will not let him see Brock after he divulges knowledge about the ricin poisoning. Jesse refuses to leave the hospital, which ruins the latest meth cook, and tells Tyrus to get Gus to come down in person to get him to leave. When Gus arrives at the hospital, Walter plants a homemade bomb under Gus' car and watches from a nearby rooftop for the right moment to detonate it. At the hospital, Gus allows Jesse to take a week off. As Gus and his bodyguards return to the car, Gus senses something is amiss and leaves the area, leaving Walter distraught about missing his chance.

== Production ==
On the Breaking Bad Insider Podcast, director Vince Gilligan reveals that the crew faced time constraints during this episode's production. Consequently, Gilligan decided during filming to cut a scripted scene wherein Walt and Jesse formulate a plan to kill Gus. In addition, the episode was filmed concurrently with the following episode, "Face Off", in order to save time.

"End Times" is the only episode in the series that Gilligan directed without having written.

== Reception ==
Seth Amitin of IGN gave the episode a 9 out of 10.

In 2019, The Ringer ranked "End Times" as the 29th best out of the 62 Breaking Bad episodes.

== Accolades ==
Aaron Paul won the Primetime Emmy Award for Outstanding Supporting Actor in a Drama Series at the 64th Primetime Emmy Awards for his performance in this episode. Kelley Dixon was also nominated for the Primetime Emmy Award for Outstanding Single-Camera Picture Editing For A Drama Series for this episode.
