= Problem Dog =

- Breaking Bad episode
- Episode no.: Season 4 Episode 7
- Directed by: Peter Gould
- Written by: Peter Gould
- Cinematography by: Michael Slovis
- Editing by: Skip Macdonald
- Original air date: August 28, 2011
- Running time: 47 minutes

Guest appearances
- David Costabile as Gale Boetticher; Steven Michael Quezada as Steven Gomez; Jere Burns as Jesse's group leader; Michael Shamus Wiles as George Merkert; Maurice Compte as Gaff

Episode chronology
← Previous "Cornered"	Next → "Hermanos"
- Breaking Bad season 4

"Problem Dog" is the seventh episode of the fourth season of the American television drama series Breaking Bad, and the 40th overall episode of the series. It originally aired on AMC in the United States on August 28, 2011.

== Plot ==
After Skyler White tells Walter White that she has negotiated the return of Walter Jr.'s Dodge Challenger to the dealership, Walter angrily drives the Challenger to a parking lot. There he burns donuts and strands the car on a concrete parking divider, then stuffs the ownership papers in the gas tank, lights them afire, and blows up the car. Saul Goodman covers up the outburst, which costs Walter $52,000.

When Walter later drops off approximately $274,000 — his bi-weekly profits — to Skyler, she is stunned by the amount, unsure how she will launder his annual meth-lab earnings of over $7 million, in mostly $50 bills, through their car wash. Meanwhile, Hank Schrader visits Los Pollos Hermanos with Walter Jr. and manages to get Gus Fring's fingerprints on a cup.

Walter convinces Jesse Pinkman to use his new position as a henchman in the organization to kill Gus, and concocts some ricin poison in the lab that Jesse hides in one of his cigarettes. Mike Ehrmantraut brings Jesse along to a sitdown between Gus and the cartel. Jesse is told to make coffee for the meeting and contemplates poisoning the coffee, but he is interrupted before he can act. Mike is surprised when the cartel sends only one man to the meeting, who delivers to Gus an ultimatum. Gus, who had been prepared for a negotiation, rejects the ultimatum. Jesse contemplates shooting Gus as the cartel representative leaves but decides not to. Mike later tells Jesse that Gus is impressed by Jesse's loyalty, but that he thinks it is "for the wrong guy."

Jesse returns to his Narcotics Anonymous group. During his turn, he discreetly shares his feelings about killing Gale Boetticher, saying he put down a "problem dog" that otherwise did nothing wrong. The group leader tells him not to judge himself, but Jesse angrily disagrees and reveals to everyone that he had used the group as a market to peddle meth. The group leader finally expresses disapproval of Jesse.

Hank meets with Steven Gomez and ASAC George Merkert and explains his theory that Gus leads a large meth operation. Although Hank's investigation into Madrigal Electromotive GmbH — the German parent company of Los Pollos Hermanos located in Hanover — was stopped by its attorney, Hank reveals that Gus's fingerprints on the cup Hank had earlier obtained from Los Pollos Hermanos match fingerprints found in Gale's apartment.

== Reception ==
Matt Richenthal of TV Fanatic awarded the episode a 4.5 out of 5, Seth Amitin of IGN rated it 9.5 out of 10, praising both the episode and Aaron Paul's acting in it, calling it "the performance of the series". Donna Bowman of The A.V. Club gave the episode an "A−".

In 2019, The Ringer ranked "Problem Dog" 51st out of the 62 total Breaking Bad episodes.
