= George Mastras =

American novelist, television writer

- Born: George Mastras Jr. April 10, 1966 (age 60); Wellesley, Massachusetts, U.S.
- Education: Yale University (BA); UCLA School of Law (JD)
- Occupations: Writer; director; television producer
- Relatives: Maria Jacquemetton (sister); Andre Jacquemetton (brother-in-law)
- Writing career
- Notable works: Breaking Bad; Fidali's Way

George Mastras Jr. (born April 10, 1966) is a Greek-American novelist, television writer, director, and television producer.

He has worked on all five seasons of the AMC drama series Breaking Bad. He won the Pen USA Literary Award in 2009, won a Primetime Emmy Award in 2013 and 2014 as one of Breaking Bad's producers, was nominated for the Edgar Allan Poe Award, and won three Writers Guild of America (WGA) Awards, for his work on the series. Mastras is also the author of the novel Fidali's Way (Scribner 2009).

== Early life and education ==
Mastras grew up in Boston. He received a bachelor of arts degree from Yale University, and a Juris Doctor degree from the UCLA School of Law.

== Career ==
Prior to writing, he worked as a criminal investigator for the public defender's office, a counselor at a juvenile correctional facility, and a defense attorney in New York City and Los Angeles.

=== Television work ===
Mastras began writing for television in 2006 for the series The Evidence. He wrote the first-season episode "Stringers". In 2007 he became a writer for the short-lived science fiction series The Dresden Files and wrote the episodes "The Boone Identity" and "The Other Dick".

Mastras joined the writing staff of the show's first season of Breaking Bad in 2008 as a story editor. He wrote the first-season episode "Crazy Handful of Nothin'". The first-season writing staff were nominated for the Writers Guild of America (WGA) Award for best new series at the February 2009 ceremony. Mastras won the PEN Center USA West Literary Award for best teleplay for "Crazy Handful of Nothin'".

Mastras was promoted to executive story editor for the show's second season. He wrote the second-season episodes "Grilled" and "Mandala". Mastras was nominated for the 2010 Edgar Allan Poe Award for Best Television Episode for "Grilled." The second-season writing staff were nominated for the WGA award for Best Drama Series at the February 2010 ceremony for their work on the second season.

Mastras was promoted to producer for the show's third season and continued to write episodes. During the third season, he wrote the episode "I.F.T." and co-wrote "Kafkaesque." Mastras was individually nominated for the 2011 WGA Award in the Best Episodic Drama category for his episode "I.F.T.". He was also nominated for the 2011 WGA Award in the category of Best Drama Series along with the third-season writing staff.

Mastras was awarded WGA awards in 2012, 2013, and 2014 along with the writing staff for the fourth and fifth seasons, respectively. He was nominated for Emmy Awards in the category of Best Drama (2010) in connection with his work as a writer and producer of the third season, and also for the fourth season (2012). Mastras was promoted to co-executive producer for the fifth season in 2012 and 2013. During the fifth season, he wrote and directed the episode "Dead Freight," for which he was individually nominated for the 2013 WGA Award in the Best Episodic Drama category and the Primetime Emmy Award for Outstanding Writing for a Drama Series.

=== Novel ===
Mastras wrote the novel Fidali's Way (Scribner 2009), a literary thriller that takes place in the war-torn Tribal Areas of Pakistan and Kashmir, where he has traveled.

=== Fellowship ===
Mastras was awarded a ABC/Walt Disney Studios Writer's Fellowship in 2005.

== Personal life ==
Mastras is the younger brother of Maria Jacquemetton (née Mastras), a producer and scriptwriter for Mad Men.
