= Gus Fring =

Fictional character in the Breaking Bad franchise

- Breaking Bad character
- Giancarlo Esposito as Gus Fring in Better Call Saul
- First appearance: "Mandala"; Breaking Bad; May 17, 2009
- Last appearance: "Fun and Games"; Better Call Saul; July 18, 2022
- Created by: Vince Gilligan; George Mastras
- Portrayed by: Giancarlo Esposito

In-universe information
- Full name: Gustavo Fring (Note: It is implied in the episode "Hermanos" that "Gustavo Fring" might not be his actual name but an alias, as the DEA could not find any record of him coming from or ever lived in Chile.)
- Aliases: Big Generalissimo; The Chicken Man; The Chilean
- Occupation: Co-founder and proprietor of Los Pollos Hermanos; Industrial laundry owner; Drug kingpin
- Significant other: Maximino "Max" Arciniega (deceased)
- Origin: Chile
- Nationality: Chilean American
- Date of birth: c. 1958; Republic of Chile
- Date of death: July 15, 2009 (aged 50–51)

Gustavo Fring (Spanish pronunciation: [gusˈtaβo ˈfɾin]) is a fictional character portrayed by Giancarlo Esposito in the Breaking Bad crime drama franchise, serving as the main antagonist in the original series and a major character in its spinoff Better Call Saul.

Outwardly, Gus is a respectable Chilean-American businessman who operates a successful fast food chain, Los Pollos Hermanos (earning him the nickname El Pollero, "the Chicken Man"). In reality, however, his legitimate businesses are fronts for a vast drug operation, which he runs in conjunction with a Mexican cartel. Gus secretly resents the cartel for killing his business partner and lover, Max Arciniega, and is constantly planning his revenge against them. Part of his plan involves building his own methamphetamine lab north of the border, which he hires Walter White to run.

Gus was created to replace the character of Tuco Salamanca (played by departing actor Raymond Cruz) during the second season of Breaking Bad. As a serious businessman, he was intended to contrast with the chaotic Tuco and act as a foil to protagonist Walter White. The character has received high acclaim, with critics hailing Gus as one of the best villains on television. Esposito's performance in the role has earned him several nominations and awards.

== Character development ==
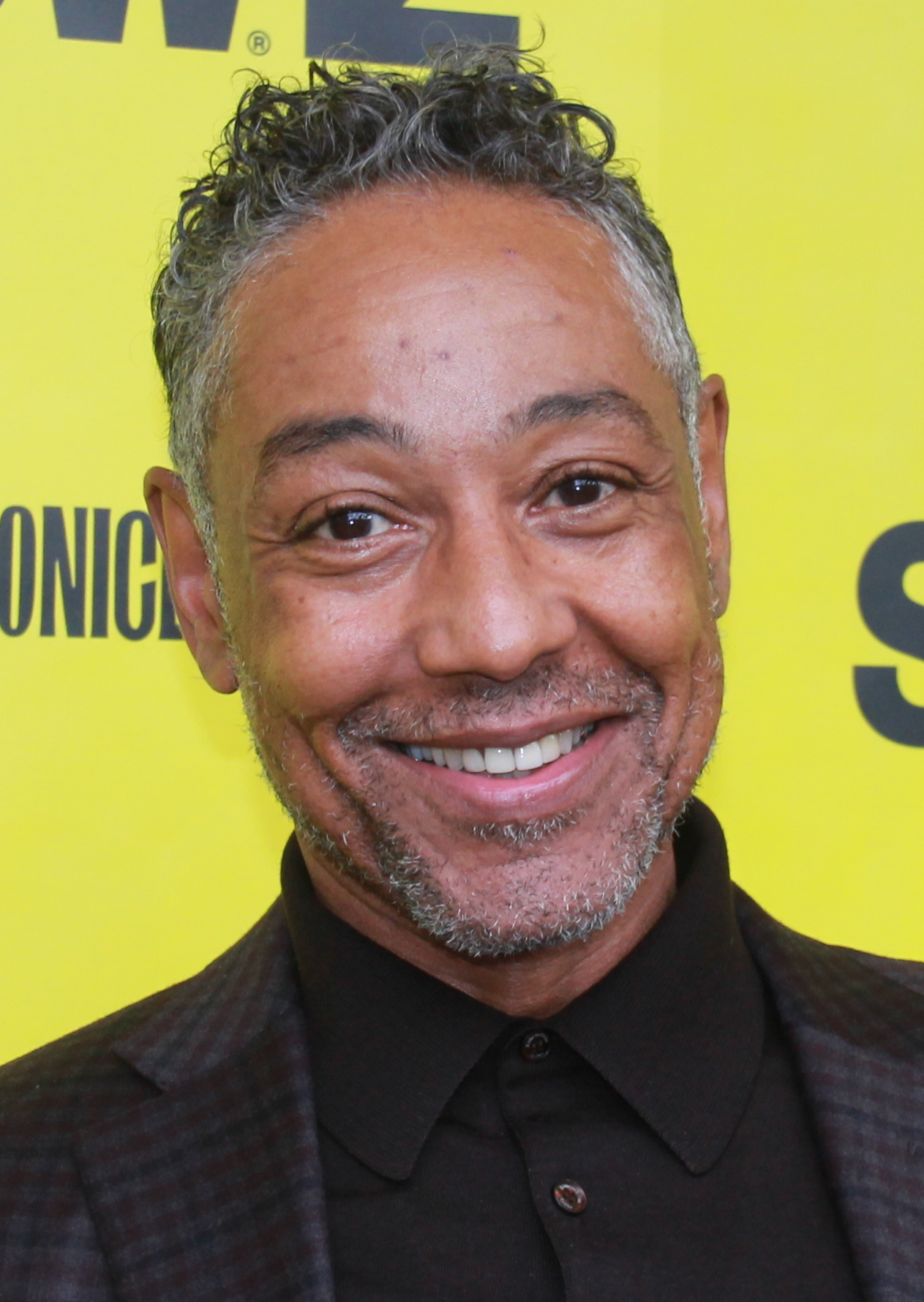
Giancarlo Esposito portrays Gus Fring in both Breaking Bad and Better Call Saul

Gustavo Fring is named after the former German international footballer Torsten Frings.

When Raymond Cruz was unable to continue as Tuco Salamanca in Breaking Bad season 2 due to his commitment to appear in The Closer, the Breaking Bad writers wrote Tuco out of the series and created the character of Gus to be his opposite. While Tuco was a meth user and "a screaming lunatic", Gus would be "a bit of a buttoned-down, cold-blooded, soft-spoken businessman".

Initially, Giancarlo Esposito was offered a character that was described to him as "very admirable, very polite", and he decided to play that character as if he had "some kind of a secret". Without knowing what that secret was, Esposito understood the potential Gus had as a growing character, therefore rejecting offers for guest appearances as originally intended for the character and insisting on becoming a series regular. To achieve Gus's trademark calmness, Esposito used yoga techniques, which allowed him to convey the character as being "a very good listener".

The humanity of Gus's personality played an integral role in his development. The loss of Max, his partner, contributed to Gus's evolution into a ruthless criminal; he stops at nothing to avenge Max's death, including the gradual killing of Hector's entire family. The loss of Max also cultivated Gus's desire to create a new "family" by empowering his meth empire, as well as the chicken restaurants. Moments before dying, Gus manages to calmly adjust his tie even after having half his face blown off. Esposito saw it as an important gesture of "when a person goes to what they've always done ... to be complete in his leaving this world".

Gus's popularity, as well as his importance to the series' development, made room for possible "flashback"-type appearances in future episodes, but that idea did not come to fruition until 2017 when Gus was brought back for the third season of Better Call Saul. When conceiving the story for El Camino: A Breaking Bad Movie, Gilligan considered including Gus in the story, but ultimately desisted from the idea due to his feelings that the film should focus only on the most important characters in Jesse Pinkman's life, which Gus was not.

== Character overview ==
Gus has a mysterious background; his name is likely an alias, since neither the Drug Enforcement Administration (DEA) nor his own enforcer Mike Ehrmantraut could find any record of him prior to his arrival in Mexico. He is supposedly a native of Chile, and is sometimes referred to by cartel members as "The Chilean". In the Better Call Saul episode "Piñata", he tells a comatose Hector a story about a coati that ate the fruit from a lúcuma tree which he tended during his childhood in Chile. In the Better Call Saul episode "Magic Man", Lalo Salamanca refers to a mysterious incident involving Gus which took place in Santiago.

Gus emigrated to Mexico in the late 1980s during the Chilean dictatorship of Augusto Pinochet. In a flashback during the Breaking Bad episode "One Minute", Hector mockingly refers to him as "Big Generalissimo", implying that Gus had a connection to the Pinochet regime. As mentioned in the Better Call Saul episode "JMM", Gus and Peter Schuler had a shared experience in Santiago, which Gus mentions to Peter to calm him down when he panics over Lalo's attacks on Gus's business. In "Hermanos", Don Eladio Vuente says that when he ordered Max killed, he spared Gus because of his unstated but apparently powerful connection to Chile. Vince Gilligan has stated that he purposely left Gus's origins ambiguous, comparing them to the briefcase in Pulp Fiction.

Gus runs at least two legitimate businesses: a chain of successful fried chicken restaurants called Los Pollos Hermanos (The Chicken Brothers) and an industrial laundry facility called Lavandería Brillante (Bright Laundry) in Albuquerque, New Mexico. Gus's restaurants are located across the southwestern United States, with his flagship restaurant in Albuquerque, and the firm's chicken farm and distribution center on the outskirts of the city. The company is a subsidiary of Madrigal Electromotive GmbH, a multinational company based in Germany that has ownership stakes in multiple subsidiaries.

While his restaurant chain is a legitimate business, it serves as a front for Gus to distribute cocaine for a Mexican cartel and later develop his own methamphetamine production and distribution business. Gus operates in partnership with two Madrigal executives: Peter Schuler, a German who serves as the company president, and Lydia Rodarte-Quayle, the company's Houston-based vice president of global logistics.

Gus usually maintains a positive public image: he is a booster for Albuquerque civic causes, including the local DEA office. In addition to befriending the special agent in charge, Gus makes large donations to the office's charitable events. Underneath this artificial cover, he is ruthlessly cruel and dangerously Machiavellian in managing his vast drug empire. He often employs a number of enforcers and has personally killed both rivals and allies.

=== Sexuality ===
Much of Gus's motives are driven by revenge for the death of his partner Maximino "Max" Arciniega by the Mexican cartel. Gus and Max's relationship was long implied to be more than business before their confirmation as lovers by showrunner Peter Gould in 2022. In the Better Call Saul episode "Sabrosito", Hector suggests that a better name for Los Pollos Hermanos might be "Los Culos Hermanos" (The Butt Brothers), insinuating that Gus and Max were gay. In "Magic Man", Lalo discusses Gus with Juan Bolsa and refers to Max as Gus's boyfriend. As shown in the Better Call Saul episode "Dedicado a Max", after arriving in Albuquerque, Gus acquired a small villa on the Mexican side of the Mexico–U.S. border. The villa serves as the residence for Dr. Barry Goodman, and contains a fountain which is dedicated to Max.

Gus's homosexuality is touched on in the episode "Fun and Games", in which he relaxes after having eliminated Lalo as a threat to his plans by visiting a wine bar and conversing with David, his favorite sommelier. Gus drops hints of his interest in David before deciding to cut the visit short and depart. In 2020, Gilligan stated that "I personally think Max was more than just a friend to Gus. I think they probably were lovers." Gould later confirmed that Gus and Max were lovers on the Ringer podcast The Watch.

== Character biography ==
=== Background ===
The Breaking Bad episode "Hermanos" shows that Gus and his long-time business partner and associate Max Arciniega started Los Pollos Hermanos as a front to sell methamphetamine that Max "cooked". They approached Don Eladio Vuente, the leader of the Juárez Cartel, with an offer to expand their drug trade with cartel help. Eladio declined, as the cartel preferred to continue distributing cocaine, and instead had his subordinate Hector Salamanca kill Max for selling meth in cartel territory without permission. Eladio spared Gus, but forced him to co-operate with the cartel on his terms.

For the next 20 years, Gus remains outwardly loyal to the cartel and is occasionally supervised by Eladio's right-hand man Juan Bolsa himself. But secretly Gus nurses a personal grudge against him as well as both Hector and Eladio, waiting patiently for his chance at revenge. After establishing himself in Albuquerque, Gus secretly looks to end his dependency on cartel cocaine by producing and distributing meth in the United States. Because the Salamanca family drug business controlled by Hector also includes Albuquerque, Gus is forced to deal with him but seeks to undermine the Salamancas.

=== Better Call Saul ===
==== Season 3 ====
Gus first crosses paths with Mike when the latter first gets involved with Nacho Varga, an associate of the Salamanca family drug business who originally hired Mike to eliminate Hector's nephew Tuco from the organization's day-to-day running activities. Mike refused because Tuco's murder would attract unwanted attention, but instead arranges for Tuco to be arrested by causing the latter to assault him in view of the police.

Following Tuco's imprisonment, Mike begins to suspect that Hector will learn about what happened and he also fears that Hector will retaliate against Mike's family - his granddaughter Kaylee and her mother Stacey respectively. Mike later acts preemptively by preparing to assassinate Hector, but is interrupted at the last moment. Mike soon tracks this interruption to Gus, who explains that he wants to be the one to determine when Hector will die. However, Gus encourages Mike to continue to disrupt the trucks Hector uses to bring ice cream store supplies and drugs from Mexico and send cash back to the cartel.

After Mike disrupts two shipments without revealing his identity, Hector demands that Gus use his Los Pollos Hermanos trucks to ship both of their drug products on a temporary basis; Gus, who had wanted this result from the start, appears to reluctantly agree. He later attempts to pay Mike for his services, but Mike refuses the money and instead asks Gus for assistance in laundering the $250,000 he stole from one of Hector's trucks; Gus provides this by arranging for Madrigal Electromotive to hire Mike as a contracted security expert and pay him monthly consulting fees.

With the new transport agreement in place, Nacho and his friend Arturo Colon arrive at the Los Pollos Hermanos warehouse and farm to pick up a drug shipment from Gus' two subordinates Tyrus Kitt and Victor respectively. Thereupon Nacho attempts to strong-arm his way into taking six kilos instead of the agreed-upon five as Hector had demanded. When Gus is called by Tyrus for guidance, he recognizes an opportunity to infiltrate the Salamanca organization and tells Tyrus to give Nacho the extra kilo. It is at this point Nacho has started to fear that Hector will learn of his role in Tuco's imprisonment and is concerned about Hector's intent to take over Nacho's father's upholstery store for use as a front business. Nacho then plans to kill Hector and secretly swaps Hector's angina medication for a placebo, hoping to induce a fatal heart attack. Mike discovers Nacho's plan and urges him to be cautious, subtly warning him about Gus by noting that "there are a lot of people other than the Salamancas to worry about".

Later on, Gus and Hector are summoned by Bolsa to a meeting with him; both Nacho and Arturo are present as well. Bolsa informs them that the use of Gus's trucks to move the drugs and cash for both organizations will be a permanent arrangement. Hector's angry outburst leads to a stroke, and Gus calls for an ambulance while administering first aid that saves Hector's life, though he is comatose. Nacho follows Mike's previous advice to switch the placebos for Hector's real medication so that foul play will not be suspected. Gus appears to notice Nacho's actions, but says nothing.

==== Season 4 ====
Hector is rushed to the hospital, while Gus alongside both Nacho and Arturo are summoned to a meeting with Bolsa at the Los Pollos distribution plant. It is there Bolsa declares that, until further notice, the Salamanca operation will continue with Nacho and Arturo in charge. Thereupon Tuco's twin cousins, Leonel and Marco. arrive to watch over Hector.

Gus hires a doctor to oversee Hector's recovery. While reviewing Hector's medical records, Gus discovers that Nacho tried to kill him after finding out there is no nitroglycerin in Hector's system. When Nacho and Arturo arrive at the chicken farm to pick up their next shipment, Gus ambushes the pair and kills Arturo whilst simultaneously having Nacho held at gunpoint. As Arturo dies in front of them, Gus tells Nacho he knows about the attempt on Hector's life and threatens to inform the Salamancas unless Nacho follows his orders - telling him "From now on. You are mine." Under Gus' instructions, Tyrus and Victor make both Arturo's death and a violent attack on Nacho look like the work of the Espinosa Gang, while Victor sells the drugs from Nacho's car to them. Nacho falsely identifies the Espinosas to the Cousins, who massacre the Espinosas to recover the "stolen" drugs before returning to Mexico to avoid the authorities. Gus orders Hector's treatment halted after he has regained movement in his right index finger, leaving his recovered mind trapped in his unhealed body.

Not long afterwards, Gus works with Mike to plan the construction of an underground meth "superlab" under Lavandería Brillante, an industrial laundry he owns, using a design provided by chemist Gale Boetticher. To do this Mike escorts engineers through the laundry and questions them about their ability to construct the lab as Gus secretly listens in. Gus offers the job to Werner Ziegler after being impressed by Werner's forthright description of the difficulty and risk. Gus provides long-term housing and amenities for Werner's crew, while Mike provides security and transportation designed to keep their presence a secret. Werner inadvertently provides details of underground concrete construction to patrons during an outing at a bar and Mike ends the conversation. The next day, Mike makes a veiled warning to Werner that Gus will have him killed if he makes the same mistake again and Werner acknowledges that he understands.

It is then Hector's remaining nephew, Lalo, arrives to oversee the Salamanca drug business. He is immediately suspicious of Gus and goes to meet him in his restaurant. Lalo then proceeds to surveil both Gus' restaurant and chicken farm. With construction behind schedule, Werner misses his wife and effects an escape to rendezvous with her. When Gus finds out, he is about to decide Werner's fate when he is convinced by Mike to let him find Werner and bring him back first. Mike tracks Werner to a money wire store, owned by a man named Fred, and then to a nearby resort. Lalo follows Mike and kills Fred to obtain the information Mike discovered, then calls resorts until he finds Werner in the call. Lalo pretends to work for Gus and discovers from Werner some of the details of the lab's construction before Mike arrives and ends the call. When Gus learns about this, he realizes that Lalo can track Werner's actions back to him and concludes that Werner must be killed. Gus offers to send men to do it, but Mike accepts responsibility because Werner escaped on his watch; so Mike reluctantly kills Werner near the airport.

==== Season 5 ====
Gus arranges for Nacho to take cocaine of inferior quality when picking up the Salamancas' drugs at Los Pollos Hermanos. Rumors of the "stepped on" product reach Nacho and fellow gang member Domingo Molina, who report them to Lalo himself. Lalo investigates and later confirms the impurity of the cocaine during a visit to Salamanca street dealers. This prompts Bolsa to summon both Gus and Lalo for a meeting at the Los Pollos Hermanos warehouse. At the meeting, Gus falsely explains that Werner Ziegler was working under Mike's supervision to construct a chilling system for Gus's chicken farm and that Werner fled after stealing cocaine. Gus goes on to claim that in an effort to hide the loss, he replaced the stolen cocaine with locally produced methamphetamine. The story explains events of which Lalo is aware, including Werner's departure from Albuquerque, pursuit by Mike, and subsequent death. Lalo accepts Gus's cover story and apology but remains suspicious. Bolsa reminds Lalo that Gus enjoys the trust of Don Eladio, and indicates that Lalo should let the matter drop. Because Lalo remains suspicious, Gus shuts down construction of the underground meth lab and has Mike send Werner's workers home. Gus then offers to continue paying Mike during the delay, but Mike declines out of frustration over Gus's seeming lack of compassion for Werner.

Soon enough, Gus coerces Nacho into providing inside information on the Salamancas. Nacho quickly gains Lalo's trust, especially when Domingo is later arrested; both Nacho and Lalo respond by hiring lawyer Jimmy McGill/Saul Goodman to secure Domingo's release from jail in exchange for the location of several of Gus's dead drops. Nacho reports the plan to Gus, who plans to cancel the drops, but Nacho advises that this will reveal a mole within the Salamanca organization. Gus relents, and on the night of the transfer he tensely waits as both Victor and Diego make sure that the DEA and local police seize nearly a million dollars without finding any trace or leads to Gus himself.

In the meantime, Mike spends several weeks feeling depressed over Werner's death and drinks to excess. After he is injured by a local gang, Gus has him taken to a pueblo Gus owns just inside the Mexican border, which includes a fountain dedicated to Max. Dr. Barry Goodman tends to Mike's wounds and Mike stays to heal. Gus visits and asks Mike to join his organization, saying that he wants Mike with him because Mike understands his need for revenge.

The next day, Gus arranges for Nacho to report to Mike about his activities to undermine the Salamanca organization. Mike works under an assumed name to secretly point the police toward Lalo for the murder of Fred the money wire store clerk. Lalo is surrounded by police and arrested. In jail under an assumed name, Lalo contacts Nacho and says he wants Nacho to burn down one of Gus's Los Pollos Hermanos restaurants. Gus and other subsidiary owners provide status reports to Peter Schuler, Madrigal's CEO. Afterward, Gus briefs Peter and Lydia on the status of the meth lab, and Gus assures Peter he will get the plan back on track. When Gus returns home, he and Nacho preserve Nacho's role as the mole in the Salamanca organization by destroying the restaurant. Gus soon wants Lalo released, knowing that Lalo still poses a threat against his legitimate activities even when imprisoned, so he has Mike provide Jimmy with the details of his investigation into Lalo. Jimmy uses the information to accuse police of witness tampering, enabling him to win a motion to release Lalo on bail.

Jimmy drives to a remote desert location to pick up the bail money from The Cousins. As he starts his return trip, he is cut off by several gunmen who take the money and prepare to kill him. The gunmen are suddenly attacked by an unknown shooter. All but one are killed, and the survivor gets away in the only attacker's vehicle that is still drivable. The unseen shooter was Mike, who was tracking Jimmy for Gus. Mike's truck was also damaged, so Jimmy and he recover the money and begin the drive back to Albuquerque in Jimmy's car. When the car breaks down, Jimmy and Mike take the money and walk cross-country to avoid the surviving gunman. After a night in the desert, Mike kills the surviving gunman and they resume walking.

Eventually both Jimmy and Mike make their way to a truck stop, where Tyrus and Victor pick them up. Mike and Jimmy agree on a cover story for Jimmy to tell Lalo after Jimmy posts his bail. Jimmy tells Lalo he was alone and walked after his car broke down so that he would not put the money at risk. Lalo says he intends to return to Mexico in order to avoid the scrutiny of police and prosecutors. Mike briefs Gus on the events in the desert, and Gus realizes the attack was ordered by Juan Bolsa to protect Gus's business. Mike tells Gus that Nacho wants to end his work as an informant on the Salamancas, but Gus refuses to part with a valuable asset. When Mike voices his concern about threatening Nacho with his father, Gus states that Nacho has "bitten the hands of his previous masters" and thus needs to be dealt with firmly.

As Gus oversees the cleanup and rebuilding of the Los Pollos Hermanos restaurant that was burned down, Mike informs him that Lalo has returned to his home in Chihuahua, and that Nacho is with him. Gus says he has sent gunmen to kill Lalo, and that Nacho may be able to help. Nacho receives a call instructing him to leave Lalo's back gate open at 3 a.m. Nacho asks for Lalo's family to be spared. Lalo is awake at 3 a.m. so Nacho sets a kitchen fire as a distraction. When Lalo goes to investigate, Nacho opens the gate and flees. The gunmen enter, wound Lalo, and kill all the occupants in his house. Lalo escapes the house through a hidden tunnel, then sneaks back in and kills all but one gunman. He then forces the survivor to call the middleman who arranged the assassination and report that Lalo is dead, before then killing the survivor off-screen.

==== Season 6 ====
In the aftermath of the firefight at Lalo's home, Lalo kills a local farmer to use as a body double and the Cousins report that Lalo is dead. Gus is skeptical, wondering how all the hitmen died yet succeeded in killing Lalo. Nevertheless, Gus arranges for Nacho to hide at a motel while he awaits transport to the U.S. It is then Gus joins Bolsa in visiting Hector to offer condolences and promise revenge, but Hector's demeanor convinces Gus that Lalo is still alive. Mike and Gus's men break into Nacho's safe and remove his cash and the fake Canadian IDs he had made for himself and his father. Victor delivers a duplicate safe, into which Mike places the cash, Nacho's fake ID, and an envelope. Bolsa and his men break into the duplicate safe and find the envelope containing the motel's phone number and details of an offshore bank account. Nacho believes he is being observed and spots a watcher, whom he eventually confronts; the watcher confirms that he indeed works for Gus, and this causes Nacho to realize that Gus has betrayed him to the cartel.

Nacho then prepares to flee, but the Cousins arrive to search for him. Nacho manages to escape the ambush and hides from the Cousins. After making a farewell call to his father, he calls Mike and demands to speak to Gus on the phone. Nacho offers to give himself up as long as his father is protected; both Gus and Mike assure Nacho that his father will be safe. Gus arranges to smuggle Nacho into the U.S. and meet up with Mike. It is then Mike and Nacho review Gus's plan for Nacho to absolve Gus of blame for Lalo's death; Nacho will say he was working for a rival drug family, then attempt to flee before Victor will shoot him dead to ensure that Nacho does not end up getting tortured by the Salamancas. As Mike takes up a firing position with his rifle, Gus and his men hand Nacho over to Bolsa and the Salamancas. Nacho claims he was working for the rival Alvarez family when he killed Lalo, and backs up his story by revealing that he attempted to kill Hector but that Gus saved him. Rather than attempt to flee so Victor can kill him, Nacho uses a piece of broken glass to free himself from his restraints, seize Bolsa's gun, and kill himself.

Following Nacho's death, Gus becomes convinced that Lalo is alive and will come for him. Gus then begins to take extreme precautions, which includes wearing a bulletproof vest under his clothes and carrying a gun. While one of his henchmen takes Gus place in his home as a lookalike, Gus uses a tunnel system to enter a nearby house, which is revealed to be an operations center from which he oversees vast surveillance activities that scour Albuquerque for signs of Lalo. His belief that Lalo is alive causes Gus sleeplessness and distractions while working at his restaurant. Later on, Gus visits the construction site of his planned meth lab and inspects it carefully before hiding a handgun in the track of an excavator.

Eventually, Lalo resurfaces when he ambushes Jimmy and his wife Kim Wexler in their apartment where he murders their acquaintance Howard Hamlin in the process. Lalo then provides Jimmy a home address and the description of a man he wants Jimmy to shoot: Gus himself. Jimmy convinces Lalo to send Kim instead. Mike apprehends her at the front door of Gus's house, and she explains Lalo's plan by pointing out Gus's body double as the man she was supposed to shoot under Lalo's instructions. Mike and his men leave for Jimmy and Kim's apartment, telling Gus to remain at home for his safety. Gus calls Kim to know more and she tells him Lalo agreed to send her instead of Jimmy, which causes Gus to realize that the shooting is a distraction. Gus then drives to Lavandería Brillante, where Lalo ambushes him and kills his bodyguards. Lalo forces Gus at gunpoint to lead him to the site while using a video camera to obtain evidence of Gus's planned meth lab for Don Eladio, which will thus prove Gus's disloyalty to the cartel. Gus then insults Eladio and the Salamancas as Lalo videotapes him, but Gus' speech is a diversion that enables him to cause a power outage which turns off the lights. In the darkness, he reaches the handgun he had hid previously and fires at Lalo as the latter tries shooting him. After turning the lights back on, Gus finds that he is wounded but has nevertheless succeeded in shooting Lalo multiple times; Lalo dies in front of Gus, who then collapses in exhaustion. Gus is later treated back at his home, while Mike supervises the burial of Lalo and Howard beneath the meth lab.

In the aftermath of Lalo's death, Hector contacts Don Eladio with information about Lalo's survival and subsequent disappearance before claiming that Gus killed Lalo for real this time. Gus is then summoned by Eladio to a meeting with him alongside both Bolsa and Hector, as well as The Cousins, at his pool in Mexico. Gus refuses to respond to Hector's allegations and, since there is no proof that Lalo survived, Eladio accepts that he was killed in the first assassination attempt. To keep peace between Hector and Gus themselves, Eladio divides between them the drug territory around Albuquerque. When he returns to the U.S. and Mike informs him that the burial of Lalo and Howard was successful, Gus tells Mike to immediately re-start work on the planned meth lab. Gus later patronizes a restaurant where he converses pleasantly with David, his favorite sommelier. David excuses himself to retrieve a rare bottle to show Gus, but then Gus suddenly cuts his visit short and leaves the restaurant.

=== Breaking Bad ===
==== Season 2 ====
When Saul begins representing Walter White and the latter seeks a buyer for his high-quality meth, Saul arranges a meeting with the unknown purchaser. Walt and his partner, Jesse Pinkman, arrive at a Los Pollos Hermanos restaurant in the South Valley, but the buyer seemingly never shows up, with Jesse and Walt unaware that Gus, the restaurant manager, had been silently watching them. Walt realizes this later and arranges a second meeting with only himself and Gus later that evening. Gus tells him that he is not interested in conducting business since Jesse was late and high for the first meeting, and is thus potentially unreliable. Walt persuades Gus to reconsider his decision, promising that he will never have to deal with Jesse and that their product will earn him enormous returns. Gus eventually agrees to purchase 38 pounds of Walt's meth for $1.2 million but only if it can be delivered within a limited time at a remote location. With Jesse unconscious after using heroin with his girlfriend Jane Margolis, Walt is forced to miss the birth of his daughter Holly to make the delivery. Shortly afterward, Gus is given a tour of the DEA's Albuquerque field office, along with other local boosters. While there, he discovers that Walt has lung cancer and that his brother-in-law, Hank Schrader, is a DEA agent.

==== Season 3 ====
Gus is pleased with the quality of Walt's blue meth and offers him $3 million for three months of his time to cook more in a high-tech "superlab" hidden under an industrial laundry that Gus owns. Walt initially refuses, but Gus eventually convinces Walt that he should cook for his family's financial security. Gus provides him with the talented chemist who set up the superlab, Gale, to help cook, but Walt needs to placate Jesse after Hank assaults him, so he convinces Gus to bring Jesse back as his assistant. Gus informs the cartel that once Walt is done with his three months, they will be free to kill him. But the Cousins soon grow impatient and travel from Mexico to the US to carry out the murder, but Gus intervenes and points them to Hank, the one who actually killed Tuco himself. Gus anonymously warns Hank about the pending attack, enabling Hank to kill Marco and critically injure Leonel, despite becoming nearly paralyzed from the waist down. Gus uses his influence with the police to distract them at the hospital so Mike can assassinate Leonel by fatally injecting him.

The attempt on Hank's life leads to a large-scale crackdown on the cartel, and Bolsa is killed. Realizing his own life was at stake, Walt agrees to continue cooking in the superlab for an extended period for $15 million with Jesse aiding him, but Gus is still concerned about Jesse's loyalties. Jesse learns that drug dealers who work for Gus were responsible for the death of Tomás, the young brother of Jesse's girlfriend Andrea. Before Jesse can kill them himself, Walt runs them over with his car and tells Jesse to flee. Walt explains to Gus that this was just a "hiccup" in their agreement. Gus agrees to overlook the matter but reinstates Gale as Walt's assistant, and privately tells Gale to learn all of Walt's methods so that he can take over from Walt. Walt realizes that Gus is trying to groom Gale as his replacement, meaning his life is at risk, so he secretly meets with Jesse and asks him to find out where Gale lives. Once Jesse finds Gale's apartment, Walt sets out to kill him. Before he can, Victor takes him to the lab under the false pretense of investigating a chemical leak. Walt realizes Mike is at the lab to kill him, so he asks Mike to let him call Jesse and convince him to come to the lab. Mike agrees, but Walt tells Jesse to kill Gale. Victor rushes to Gale's apartment, but Jesse arrives first and reluctantly kills Gale by shooting him dead.

==== Season 4 ====
Furious upon learning of Gale's murder, Gus arrives at the lab, where Walt and Jesse have been secured by Victor and Mike. Knowing he was recognized at Gale's apartment, Victor fears for his life and attempts to show his usefulness to Gus by beginning to cook meth, which he learned how to do while guarding Walt and Jesse. Walt begs for Gus to spare them, but they are shocked when Gus suddenly slices open Victor's neck and lets him bleed to death in front of them. Gus calmly tells Walt and Jesse to get back to work and increases oversight in the lab by installing security cameras and having Mike and Tyrus watch them while they work. Mike suggests to Gus that they may be able to drive a wedge between Walt and Jesse. Mike takes Jesse out of the lab to help pick up dead drops and carry out other tasks and arranges for Jesse to foil a planned attack on him, which boosts Jesse's confidence and increases his sense of loyalty to Mike and Gus. Gus is impressed by Jesse's mettle and has Mike involve him in more work outside the lab. Worried about their safety, Walt gives Jesse a cigarette with a capsule of ricin hidden inside and tells him to poison Gus when he gets the chance, but Jesse does not follow through.

Gus arranges to meet with Don Eladio and the other cartel leaders to work out the differences that have caused the cartel to disrupt Gus's business and he brings Mike and Jesse with him. Jesse cooks a superior batch of meth and Gus offers to have him stay in Mexico and work for the cartel. Jesse is apprehensive but the offer is a ruse. During the party at Eladio's house to celebrate their rapprochement, Gus tricks Eladio and most of the other cartel leaders into drinking from a poisoned bottle of tequila. Gus takes the first drink to alleviate suspicion but forces himself to vomit afterwards. During the fight that ensues after cartel leaders begin dying, Jesse helps the ill Gus and wounded Mike escape, killing Hector's last known living grandson, Joaquin Salamanca, in the process. He brings them to Dr. Goodman at a makeshift hospital Gus had arranged at his villa. After recovering, Gus returns to Albuquerque and taunts Hector, telling him the cartel leaders are all dead, and that because of Joaquin's death, the Salamanca family line ends with Hector. Jesse is no longer loyal to Walt and refuses to serve as his protector. With the DEA beginning to connect Gale's death to Gus, Gus fires Walt and starts planning to kill Hank, threatening to kill Walt's family if he retaliates or informs.

After failing to enlist Jesse's help in killing Gus, Walt poisons Andrea's son Brock and convinces Jesse that Gus is responsible. Jesse agrees to help Walt, who tries to kill Gus with a pipe bomb attached to his car; Gus senses something amiss and walks away. Walt recovers the bomb and Jesse tells him about Gus's routine, including visits to Hector at the nursing home. Persuaded by Walt's promise of final revenge against Gus, Hector pretends to be a DEA informant and allows the bomb to be strapped to the underside of his wheelchair. Gus visits Hector and prepares to kill him with a lethal injection, but Hector begins ringing the bell on his wheelchair, which activates the bomb. Gus tries to flee but the bomb explodes, killing Hector and Tyrus; Gus appears unharmed at first, but the camera pans to reveal that the blast has torn off the right side of his face. He reflexively adjusts his tie before collapsing to the floor, dead.

==== Season 5 ====
Gus's death has numerous consequences. The investigation into his death reaches his restaurant business and the destroyed superlab, which Walt and Jesse burned after Gus died. Knowing the security camera recordings stored on Gus's laptop can incriminate them, Walt, Jesse, and Mike use an electromagnet outside the police station to destroy the computer and its hard drive while it is in the police evidence room. The police recover the account numbers and access codes for the offshore accounts Gus previously set up to pay his employees for their silence and seize the accounts. Mike, Walt, and Jesse partner in a new meth business, with Mike continuing to pay Gus's former employees out of his share of the profits in order to assure their continued silence. When police successfully interdict these payments, Walt fears his identity will be exposed and attempts to obtain the employees' names from Mike so he can have them killed. When Mike refuses, Walt kills him. Walt then obtains the names from Lydia Rodarte-Quayle and has Gus's former employees killed in prison before they can reveal Walt's identity, effectively bringing an end to Gus's drug distribution empire.

=== Los Pollos Hermanos Employee Training with Gus Fring ===
AMC released a series of ten short videos on YouTube and their social media accounts during season three of Better Call Saul as Los Pollos Hermanos Employee Training with Gus Fring, combining live-action shots featuring Esposito as Gus along with animated segments, presented as employee training videos for Gus's Los Pollos Hermanos restaurant workers. The series won the Primetime Emmy Award for Outstanding Short Form Comedy or Drama Series in 2017.

== Reception and legacy ==
For his portrayal of Gus, Esposito won the Critics' Choice Television Award for Best Supporting Actor in a Drama Series at the 3rd Critics' Choice Television Awards and received three nominations for the Primetime Emmy Award for Outstanding Supporting Actor in a Drama Series. Paste ranked Gus number 3 in its list of the 20 Best Characters of 2011. TV Guide named him No. 3 in their 2013 list of The 60 Nastiest Villains of All Time, and in 2016, Rolling Stone ranked him No. 7 of their "40 Greatest TV Villains of All Time". Gus's depiction as a gay man has received praise as an example of a compelling antagonist driven by his sexuality.

Although the character of Gus Fring and Esposito's performance has been praised by critics, some native Spanish speakers have criticized the actor for an allegedly stilted and unnatural accent when speaking Spanish. A 2014 NPR article focusing on representations of Spanish and Spanglish in American television singled out the character of Gus, with one fan saying he was "so painful to listen to" and that it made them angry that "such a pivotal and fantastic character would have such a giant, noticeable, nails-on-a-chalkboard flaw."

== See also ==
- List of characters in the Breaking Bad franchise
