= Jesse Pinkman =

Breaking Bad character

- Breaking Bad character
- Aaron Paul as Jesse Pinkman
- First appearance: "Pilot"; Breaking Bad; January 20, 2008
- Last appearance: "Waterworks"; Better Call Saul; August 8, 2022
- Created by: Vince Gilligan
- Portrayed by: Aaron Paul

In-universe information
- Full name: Jesse Bruce Pinkman
- Aliases: Cap'n Cook; Diesel; Jesse Jackson; Mr. Driscoll
- Gender: Male
- Occupation: Meth manufacturer and distributor; Drug enforcer
- Affiliation: Walter White's drug empire
- Significant others: Jane Margolis; Andrea Cantillo
- Home: Albuquerque, New Mexico, U.S.; Haines, Alaska, U.S.

Jesse Bruce Pinkman is a fictional character in the American crime drama television series Breaking Bad, portrayed by Aaron Paul. He is a crystal meth cook and dealer who works with his former high school chemistry teacher, Walter White (played by Bryan Cranston). Jesse is the only character besides Walter to appear in every episode of the show. Paul reprised the role in 2019 as the protagonist of the spin-off sequel film El Camino: A Breaking Bad Movie, set after its finale, and again in 2022 for the sixth and final season of the spin-off prequel sequel series Better Call Saul, being one of the few characters to appear across both shows and the movie.

Despite initial plans to kill off the character at the end of the first season, Paul's performance convinced the showrunner and head writer Vince Gilligan to keep Jesse in the show. The character and Paul's performance received acclaim from critics and fans. Critics especially praised Jesse's character development from an unsympathetic drug dealer to the moral compass of the show as he becomes increasingly guilty and remorseful for his and Walter White's actions while involved in the drug trade. For his portrayal, Paul won the Primetime Emmy Award for Outstanding Supporting Actor in a Drama Series in 2010, 2012, and 2014, making him the first actor to win the category three times since its separation into drama and comedy.

== In-universe biography ==
=== Pre-Breaking Bad ===
Jesse Bruce Pinkman was born into a middle-class family in Albuquerque, New Mexico. At the time the series starts, he has long been estranged from his parents due to his drug addiction and lifestyle as a drug dealer. After being forced to leave his parents' residence, Jesse moved in with his Aunt Ginny, for whom he cared until her death from cancer; as a result, he became very knowledgeable about the disease. Afterward, he was allowed to stay in her home, the ownership of which fell to Jesse's parents.

Jesse was a poor student in high school and preferred hanging out with his friends and smoking marijuana to studying. Walter White, whom Jesse almost always calls "Mr. White", was his chemistry teacher and gave Jesse a failing grade in his class. Walt himself later says that he never thought Jesse would amount to much, although Jesse's mother Diane (Tess Harper) recalls that Walt "must have seen some potential in Jesse; he really tried to motivate him. He was one of the few teachers who cared." Despite his poor academic standing, Jesse was able to graduate, with Walt present on stage when he received his diploma.

In his first chronological appearance, which took place in 2004 during the Better Call Saul episode "Waterworks", Jesse is outside of Saul Goodman's office when Kim Wexler (Rhea Seehorn) emerges after having signed their divorce papers. As Jesse takes a cigarette from Kim, he recognizes her as the public defender who got his friend Christian "Combo" Ortega out of trouble after he stole the Baby Jesus from a Nativity display. Jesse is there with Emilio Koyama, who decided to hire Saul based on a TV advertisement. Jesse asks Kim if Saul is a good lawyer, to which she replies, "when I knew him, he was."

=== Season 1 ===
When Walt is diagnosed with lung cancer and considers making methamphetamine to provide for his family, he tries to learn the illegal drug business by accompanying his brother-in-law Hank Schrader (Dean Norris), a Drug Enforcement Administration (DEA) agent, on a ridealong. During a drug bust, he spots Jesse running away from the scene, but Jesse's partner Emilio Koyama (John Koyama) is arrested. Walt subsequently realizes that Jesse is "Cap'n Cook", a meth cook Hank is investigating. Walt uses student records to track down Jesse, his former pupil, and blackmails him into partnering up and letting Walt "cook" in the production side of Jesse's illegal drug trade. Walt plans to use his knowledge of chemistry to cook potent meth that Jesse will distribute, and he gives Jesse $7,000 to purchase a recreational vehicle (RV) which will be used as a rolling meth lab. Jesse wastes most of the money while partying at a strip club, but one of his friends, Combo (Rodney Rush), lets Jesse purchase his family's RV for $1,400.

After Walt cooks his first batch of meth, Jesse is struck by its quality, calling it the purest he has ever seen. He approaches Emilio's cousin Domingo "Krazy-8" Molina (Maximino Arciniega), an Albuquerque meth distributor, to propose doing business with him. Krazy-8 is suspicious, so Emilio and he make Jesse bring them to meet Walt. Emilio recognizes Walt as having been with Hank during the DEA bust, and they attempt to kill Walt, but he produces phosphine gas that kills Emilio and incapacitates Krazy-8, allowing Walt to flee with the unconscious Jesse. Once back in town, Walt has Jesse shop for a plastic container in which he plans to dissolve Emilio's body with hydrofluoric acid. Jesse cannot find a container big enough, so he dissolves the body in the upstairs bathtub of Ginny's house, which burns a hole through the bathroom floor and spills the remains into the downstairs hallway. After cleaning up the scene and killing Krazy-8, Walt and Jesse attempt to carry out meth distribution on their own.

Walt and Jesse move their lab from the RV to Jesse's basement. Their product becomes a big enough presence in Albuquerque's drug scene that it becomes the focus of Hank's investigation. Dissatisfied with the amount of money Jesse is making as a low-level dealer, Walt convinces him to find a high-end distributor. Skinny Pete (Charles Baker), one of Jesse's friends, puts him in contact with Tuco Salamanca (Raymond Cruz), a powerful Mexican drug kingpin operating in Albuquerque. At their first meeting, Tuco beats Jesse badly enough that he has to be hospitalized. After Walt strong-arms Tuco into a lucrative, albeit unstable, partnership, Walt and Jesse expand their operations by stealing a large drum of methylamine. This enables them to produce even more potent meth in larger quantities.

=== Season 2 ===
The second season begins with Walt and Jesse delivering a fresh batch to Tuco, who senselessly beats one of his henchmen, "No Doze" (Cesar Garcia), to death as the stunned duo watch helplessly. After the DEA conducts a raid on his Albuquerque operations, the increasingly paranoid Tuco believes that Walt and Jesse are about to betray him. Tuco kidnaps the pair and takes them to a remote house in the desert, where he cares for his paralyzed uncle, Hector Salamanca. There, Walt and Jesse are held against their will for several hours, with Tuco stating his intention to take them to a "superlab" in Mexico. However, Walt and Jesse escape after a struggle with Tuco; they flee the scene and watch as Hank—who has been guided to the house by the LoJack on Jesse's car, while searching for the missing Walt—kills Tuco in a gunfight outside the house. Walt and Jesse, undetected by Hank, wander on foot through the desert before hitching a ride back to civilization. The DEA seizes Jesse's car and money.

Realizing the authorities will track him down, Jesse seeks help from his friend, Brandon "Badger" Mayhew (Matt Jones). They move the lab from Jesse's house back to the RV. The RV is subsequently towed away by Badger's cousin, Clovis (Tom Kiesche) and stored on his lot for a $1,000 storage fee, for which Jesse can only pay half of upfront. The next day, Jesse's parents evict him from his home after discovering he had been cooking meth in the basement. He cannot find a friend to stay with, and his remaining few belongings and his motorcycle are stolen. With nowhere else to go, Jesse breaks into Clovis' lot and passes out in the RV. Resolving to get his life back together, Jesse buys an inconspicuous Toyota Tercel and finds a new apartment. The landlord, Jane Margolis (Krysten Ritter), is a part-time tattoo artist and a recovering heroin addict. She and Jesse soon become romantically involved. Jane, however, tries to hide this relationship from her father, Donald (John de Lancie), who owns their building.

When Skinny Pete is robbed by a pair of addicts, Walt tells Jesse to "handle it". Jesse goes to the addicts' house to confront them, but the plan goes awry when one of the addicts kills the other in front of him. While traumatic for Jesse, the incident ultimately helps his business; a rumor quickly spreads that Jesse killed the addict, giving him a fearsome reputation on the streets. Jesse is also instrumental in retaining the services of corrupt lawyer Saul Goodman (Bob Odenkirk) to help him and Walt launder their money and get out of legal trouble.

After Combo is murdered by rival dealers, Jesse starts using heroin with Jane to cope with his grief. His behavior nearly costs Walt a $1.2 million drug transaction with the powerful meth distributor Gus Fring (Giancarlo Esposito). Angered, Walt refuses to give Jesse his half of the money until he enters rehab. When Jane learns about the money, she blackmails Walt into giving Jesse his share, hoping to use the money to escape to New Zealand. Walt later returns to Jesse's apartment hoping to reconcile and finds Jesse and Jane asleep after getting high. He accidentally rolls Jane onto her back, and when she starts to choke on her vomit, Walt allows her to die. When Jesse discovers her dead body the next morning, he blames himself and goes on another drug binge. Walt rescues him from a crack house and checks him into a rehabilitation clinic.

=== Season 3 ===
While in rehab, Jesse is told by a drug counselor to accept himself for who he is. At this point, Jesse has learned that Jane's father, an air traffic controller, was so distraught over her death that he inadvertently caused a deadly mid-air collision. Jesse tells Walt that he has taken the counselor's advice and accepted himself as the "bad guy". Jesse leaves rehab clean and sober and decides to settle unfinished business. First, with help from Saul, Jesse dupes his parents into selling him his aunt's house, at a drastically reduced price.

Hank correctly deduces that Jesse's RV is the rolling meth lab he has been looking for and tracks it down to a local junkyard, where Walt has brought it so it can be destroyed before Hank searches it. Jesse believes that Walt is stealing the RV from him and goes to the junkyard as Hank follows. Walt and Jesse lock themselves inside, and Walt and Saul arrange a fake emergency phone call to Hank, which says his wife Marie (Betsy Brandt) is in the hospital. Hank leaves without searching the RV, giving Walt and Jesse enough time to destroy it in a vehicle compactor. A furious Hank follows Jesse home and beats him into unconsciousness. The incident leads to Hank not only getting suspended, but Jesse threatening to sue him for everything he has. While Jesse is hospitalized, Walt—who is now working for Gus as a meth cook—persuades Gus to renew Jesse and Walt's partnership so Jesse will drop the lawsuit. Jesse and Walt cook larger amounts of meth in Gus' underground "superlab", earning considerably more money.

Jesse becomes romantically involved with Andrea Cantillo (Emily Rios), a single mother and recovering meth addict from his Narcotics Anonymous meetings. He eventually discovers that her 11-year-old brother, Tomas (Angelo Martinez), had killed Combo on behalf of two rival dealers. Jesse concocts a plan to kill the dealers with ricin that Walt had earlier created, but Jesse is forced to cancel the plan after learning the dealers work for Gus. However, after Tomas is found murdered, an enraged Jesse sets out to kill the dealers anyway. Walt intervenes at the last moment, killing the two dealers and telling Jesse to run.

After Jesse goes into hiding, Gus replaces him with Gale Boetticher (David Costabile), Walt's previous assistant in the superlab. Walt realizes Gus is plotting to have Gale master his and Jesse's meth formula as part of a larger plan to be rid of him. To prevent this, Walt plots to have Jesse pre-emptively kill Gale. Jesse begs Walt to go to the police instead, insisting that he does not have it in him to kill someone. When Walt is cornered by Gus' men Mike Ehrmantraut (Jonathan Banks) and Victor (Jeremiah Bitsui) at the superlab, he calls Jesse and tells him that he will have to kill Gale. Jesse shows up at Gale's apartment and, after a moment's hesitation, shoots him dead.

=== Season 4 ===
Immediately after Gale's murder, Walt and Jesse are brought back to the superlab. Stuck with Walt and Jesse because he does not have Gale, and angry at Victor for being recognized at the scene of Gale's murder, Gus slices Victor's throat with a box cutter in a gruesome show of force. Jesse attempts to distract himself from the guilt of killing Gale by setting up a perpetual drug rave at his house. He also places a large amount of drug money in Andrea's mailbox, urging her to leave Albuquerque with her young son, Brock (Ian Posada). Jesse becomes increasingly indifferent to his own welfare and steals meth from the superlab to fuel his drug-laden parties.

Mike informs Gus of Jesse's recklessness, but instead of ordering Jesse's death, Gus has Mike take Jesse on an errand to collect drop money. On the last pickup, Jesse sees a man with a shotgun approaching the car and attempts to run him over, then rams the man's car and drives away. It is revealed that the man with the shotgun was working for Mike, and this was designed to test Jesse's loyalty. Walt correctly guesses that Gus is trying to drive a wedge into their partnership, but Jesse dismisses him. During Jesse's next assignment with Mike, which involves the retrieval of stolen meth from two addicts, Jesse gets one addict fixated on digging a hole in the yard and disarms the other, which impresses Gus. Shortly afterward, Jesse resumes his relationship with Andrea and becomes a father figure to Brock.

Walt tasks Jesse with killing Gus with a vial of ricin, which Jesse hides in a cigarette. Later on, when Gus is meeting with members of the cartel, Jesse considers spiking Gus' coffee with the ricin but refrains from doing so upon realizing that he could poison the third parties present (and might end up drinking the coffee himself). Walt pushes Jesse to try to set up a meeting when Walt learns Hank is investigating Gus, but Walt backs off when he sees a text message implying that Jesse has been lying about not meeting Gus. Walt puts a tracking device on Jesse's vehicle and learns that Jesse had dinner at Gus' house the night before. Walt confronts Jesse, leading to a physical fight. Jesse gains the upper hand and commands Walt to leave and never come back.

Gus and Mike take Jesse on a trip to Mexico to have him teach Walt's formula to the cartel's chemists. Impressed with Jesse's skill, Gus seemingly arranges to have Jesse become their permanent cook. However, during a party, Gus uses a poisoned bottle of tequila to kill off the cartel's leadership, including its chieftain, Don Eladio Vuente (Steven Bauer). Jesse saves Mike, who is shot during the chaos, and Gus, who purposely drank the poisoned tequila to get the cartel to do the same. Afterward, Gus offers to hire Jesse as his full-time cook. Jesse accepts on the condition that Gus spares Walt's life. When Walt's wife Skyler (Anna Gunn) and his children receive protection from the DEA following a threat on Hank's life, Gus uses the information to portray Walt as an informant, further attempting to widen the gap between Walt and Jesse. Walt goes to Jesse's house to plead for help, but Jesse throws him off his property.

Shortly afterward, Brock falls deathly ill. Jesse guesses that Brock has been poisoned by ricin and immediately assumes Walt is responsible. Jesse shows up at Walt's house and confronts him at gunpoint. However, Walt convinces Jesse that it was Gus who poisoned Brock, reminding him of Gus' willingness to kill children. Jesse eventually tells Saul about Gus' visits to cartel enforcer Hector Salamanca (Mark Margolis) at the latter's nursing home, leading Walt to visit Hector himself and talk him into luring Gus to the location. Gus is subsequently killed when Walt sets up a pipe bomb beneath Hector's wheelchair, which the latter activates. After learning of Gus' death, Walt storms the superlab and rescues Jesse from Gus' men.

After they destroy the superlab, Jesse reveals that Brock was not poisoned by ricin, but by lily-of-the-valley berries. Jesse realizes that Gus could not have poisoned Brock, but Walt assures him that killing Gus was the only course of action they could have taken. The final scene of the fourth season shows a potted lily-of-the-valley plant in Walt's backyard, revealing that Walt had poisoned Brock in order to regain Jesse's loyalty and spur him into action as part of Walt's plan to kill Gus.

=== Season 5 ===
==== Part 1 ====
Jesse is upset by what happened to Brock and becomes obsessed with finding out what happened to the ricin. Jesse has Walt help him search Jesse's house for the cigarette containing the poison. Walt plants a replica of the ricin cigarette in Jesse's vacuum cleaner, which Jesse finds. Jesse then agrees to continue cooking meth with Walt. Soon afterward, Walt's manipulations of Jesse's feelings for Andrea and Brock cause him to break up with her so that Andrea and Brock will be safe from the effects of his involvement in selling drugs.

He and Walt join forces with Mike to establish their own meth operation. After their supplier, Lydia Rodarte-Quayle (Laura Fraser), is unable to continue stealing methylamine precursor by the barrel, she puts them onto a way to steal 1,000 gallons from a train traveling through New Mexico. During the heist, their accomplice, Todd Alquist (Jesse Plemons), shoots and kills a young boy, Drew Sharp (Samuel Webb), who was witness to the crime. Jesse is horrified and decides to quit the meth business. Mike and Jesse want to get out of the business, and arrange for rival drug lord Declan (Louis Ferreira) to purchase the methylamine for $15 million. Walt refuses to sell his share, and Declan will not buy unless he gets it all. Instead, Walt makes a deal that enables Jesse and Mike to be paid, while Walt continues to cook for Declan. Hoping to lure Jesse back as his assistant, Walt refuses to pay him, and Jesse leaves, saying he would rather give up the money than continue in the drug business. When Walt decides to stop cooking, he goes to Jesse's house and pays him his share of the buyout.

==== Part 2 ====
Overwhelmed with guilt for Drew's death, and correctly guessing that Mike is dead, Jesse tries to give his money to Saul with instructions to give half to Drew's parents and the other half to Mike's granddaughter. When Saul refuses because doing so will draw too much attention, Jesse drives around town randomly tossing bundles of cash onto sidewalks and front lawns. He is quickly arrested and interrogated by the APD, who then allows Hank – who now knows that Walt is "Heisenberg", the meth kingpin he has been trying to catch – to question him. Jesse does not confess anything and Saul soon posts his bail. Saul, Walt, and Jesse meet in the desert, where Walt suggests that Jesse skip town and start over with a new identity. Jesse agrees, but just as he is about to be picked up by Saul's "disappearer", he realizes that Saul's bodyguard Huell Babineaux (Lavell Crawford) took his ricin cigarette, meaning that Walt was the one who orchestrated Brock's poisoning. Jesse goes back to Saul's office and beats him up until he admits that Walt told him to steal the ricin. Jesse then goes to Walt's house and douses it in gasoline, intending to burn it down. Before Jesse can light the fire, Hank arrives and convinces him that the best way to get Walt is for them to work together.

Hank allows Jesse to stay at his house so he can tape Jesse's confession. Hank plans to have Jesse wear a wire in order to record Walt making incriminating statements. Jesse goes to the meeting, while Hank and his partner Steve Gomez (Steven Michael Quezada) watch in surveillance trucks. Jesse notices a suspicious man near Walt, mistakenly assuming that Walt has hired an assassin to kill him. He walks to a pay phone, calls Walt, and says he intends to end Walt's drug business. Jesse then tells Hank he has a better way to get to Walt: through his drug money.

Hank interrogates Huell and deduces that Walt buried his money in the desert. Jesse calls Walt claiming that he has found the money and threatens to burn it if Walt does not show up. Walt falls for the ruse and drives into the desert to check on the cash, with Hank and Jesse in pursuit. Walt realizes Jesse has tricked him and calls Todd's uncle, Jack Welker (Michael Bowen), the head of a biker gang with ties to the Aryan Brotherhood, with a request to come to the site and kill Jesse. Walt calls it off when he sees Hank and Gomez are accompanying Jesse, and Walt surrenders to Hank. Walt is arrested and Jesse spits in his face. Jack's crew then arrive despite being told not to, and a gunfight ensues in which Hank and Gomez are killed. Jesse hides under Walt's car, but Walt gives away Jesse's location. Todd stops Jack from executing Jesse, stating that they should find out what he told the authorities before they carry out the hit, which Walt agrees to. Just before Jack's gang takes Jesse away, Walt spitefully tells Jesse that he watched Jane die. At Jack's headquarters, the gang tortures Jesse until he reveals all he knows, and then locks him in a cell. Todd escorts the chained Jesse to a meth lab, where Jesse notices a photograph of Andrea and Brock before Todd tells him he must cook meth for the gang.

Some time later, Jesse escapes but is quickly recaptured while attempting to scale a fence. As punishment, Todd takes Jesse to Andrea's house and kills her right in front of him. Jack threatens to kill Brock if he attempts to escape again.

A few months later, Walt returns from his hiding place in New Hampshire. After discovering that Jesse is alive, Walt goes to Jack's compound, claiming to have a new meth formula to sell. Jack intends to kill Walt, but Walt accuses Jack of partnering with Jesse to sell meth. Jack has Jesse brought in so he can prove Jesse is forced to work for him and is not a partner. Having a change of heart, Walt tackles Jesse to the floor just as gunfire from a machine gun Walt had hidden in his car erupts on the building, killing Jack's entire gang except for Jack and Todd. Jesse strangles Todd to death using the chain from his shackles, then takes the key from Todd's pocket and frees himself. After shooting and killing Jack, Walt hands Jesse the gun and asks Jesse to kill him. Noticing that Walt has been mortally wounded by the gunfire, Jesse tells Walt that if he wants to die, he should kill himself. Before Jesse leaves, Walt answers a call from Lydia on Todd's phone and tells her she will soon be dead because he poisoned her with ricin. Walt gives Jesse a final nod before Jesse drives off in Todd's El Camino, laughing and crying with relief.

=== El Camino ===
After fleeing the Brotherhood compound in Todd's El Camino, Jesse drives to the home of Skinny Pete and Badger, who hide the car and give Jesse a place to sleep. The next morning, Jesse calls Old Joe to dispose of the El Camino, but Joe leaves after finding its LoJack. Pete and Badger give Jesse the money they got from Walt, and Badger gives Jesse his Pontiac Fiero. Badger drives Pete's Ford Thunderbird several hours south to make it appear that Jesse fled to Mexico. Pete stays home and awaits police, intending to cover for Jesse by claiming he traded the Thunderbird for the El Camino.

Jesse sneaks into Todd's apartment and searches for the rest of the drug money. He finds it after several hours, but opportunistic thieves Neil Kandy (Scott MacArthur) and Casey (Scott Sheperd) arrive, disguised as police, and search for the money as well. Neil disarms Jesse, who reveals he found the cash and offers to split it with him. As they depart, Jesse recognizes Neil as the welder who built the tether he was fastened to while forced to cook meth for the Brotherhood.

Jesse finds Saul's "disappearer", Ed Galbraith (Robert Forster), who wants $250,000 to help Jesse leave town. Jesse is $1,800 short and Ed refuses to help until he is paid in full. Knowing they are being surveilled, Jesse calls his parents and feigns willingness to surrender, drawing them and the police away from the Pinkman house. Jesse enters unseen and takes two pistols from his father's safe.

Jesse drives to Neil's shop. He asks for $1,800, but Neil refuses. Seeing the pistol in Jesse's waistband, Neil, high on cocaine, challenges him to a duel for his share of the cash. Jesse agrees, and in the ensuing gunfight kills both Neil and Casey. Jesse recovers Neil's cash and departs after setting an explosion to cover his tracks.

Ed provides Jesse with a new identity with the surname "Driscoll" and smuggles him to Haines, Alaska. Jesse hands Ed a letter for Brock and says there is no one else he wants to say goodbye to. As Jesse drives off, he has a flashback to his time with Jane. He tells her he admires what she said about going wherever the universe takes her, but she dismisses it as "metaphorical" and encourages him to make his own decisions. Jesse drives on, smiling.

=== Post-El Camino ===
After the events of El Camino, Francesca Liddy (Tina Parker) uses a payphone to receive a call from Saul Goodman, who had been hiding under the name Gene Takavic in Omaha, Nebraska. As Walt and Jesse had done, Saul used Ed Galbraith to disappear to a new location under an assumed identity. Francesca tells him that everyone connected to Walt is either dead or cooperating with the authorities, and that both Saul and Jesse Pinkman are the two biggest targets remaining. However, she also says that she heard Jesse's car was found "down by the border", implying that Skinny Pete's plan to throw the authorities off Jesse's trail worked.

== Production ==
Penn Badgley and Aaron Paul did screen tests for the role of Jesse Pinkman. Series creator Vince Gilligan favored Paul, and persuaded network executives to cast him. In the original pilot script for Breaking Bad, Jesse's name was Marion Alan Dupree. Gilligan originally intended for Jesse Pinkman's character to be killed at the end of Breaking Bad's first season. He wanted Jesse to die in a botched drug deal, as a plot device to plague Walt with guilt. However, Gilligan said by the second episode of the season, he was so impressed with Jesse's character and Aaron Paul's performance that "it became pretty clear early on that it would be a huge, colossal mistake to kill off Jesse". Gilligan also liked the chemistry between Paul and Bryan Cranston. The character has been said to become the "flawed moral center" to Walter White in later seasons. Paul has said that he initially saw the character as "black-and-white", but that over time it had become evident that Jesse "has a huge heart; it just got messed up".

Paul felt that he had a "lock" onto who the character was when making the episode "Cancer Man" in which Jesse's family is introduced. Paul also noted how after Jesse's parents disown him, the character looks for a father figure in Walt and Mike.

The writers wrestled with the question of how long Jesse's innocence would survive Walt's influence. Gilligan has said that Jesse's naïveté makes him a better man than Walt.

Paul found it difficult to play Jesse sober in the third season. Paul says it "really threw me for a loop. It was hard to nail him. I had no idea where they were going with this character. He's so numb and cut off from everything." Paul prepared by spending time at a rehabilitation clinic, observing its patients, and interviewing its director.

The fourth season premiere, "Box Cutter", showed Walt pleading with Gus to save Jesse, demonstrating Walt's paternal relationship with and loyalty to Jesse. Walt tells Gus that he refuses to continue cooking if Gus kills Jesse. Paul felt this was "the first moment that Jesse realizes that Walt's loyalty is to Jesse."

The party scenes at Jesse's house in "Thirty-Eight Snub" and "Open House" were created as a way for Jesse to cope with his guilt and self-hatred after murdering Gale Boetticher in the third-season finale, "Full Measure". Gilligan said these scenes were written because he wanted to demonstrate that the actions of the characters in Breaking Bad have major consequences. The writers discussed how Jesse would react to having killed Gale, and they chose the party story arc, in part, because they felt it would be the most unexpected for the audience. Bryan Cranston says of those scenes, "I thought it was a great way to show a person going through a private hell. That everybody suffers, deals with their own personal loss in many different ways."

The party scenes continued in the next episode, "Open House," though the party was darker and more decrepit in this episode.

In "Open House," Jesse goes go-karting by himself. The idea was inspired by Paul and other crew members going kart racing between filming episodes. The idea for Jesse to have his head shaved in "Bullet Points" was also Paul's, as he felt it was appropriate for Jesse's inner struggle.

Gilligan has said that he deliberately left Jesse's ultimate fate ambiguous at the end of "Felina", preferring to let the viewer decide what happens to him. However, on November 6, 2018, rumors began that a feature Breaking Bad sequel film was in the works, with the logline stating that the film "tracks the escape of a kidnapped man and his quest for freedom". Many speculated that this would reveal the fate of Jesse Pinkman from immediately after the events of the Breaking Bad season finale. This sequel eventually became El Camino: A Breaking Bad Movie which focused on Jesse immediately following his escape from the compound.

Regarding Pinkman's new life after the events of the film in Haines, Alaska, Gilligan speculated that Pinkman "would enjoy the brewery and maybe get a job with the ski manufacturer ... the very nice people of Alaska would welcome him into the community." Paul believed that Jesse is "going to keep his nose clean. He has quite a bit of cash on hand. And he's going to live a very modest lifestyle. He's moving to a very small place in Alaska, so he doesn't need all that much money. He knows how to work with his hands, and so he just needs to refresh those skills and become the artist that he was always meant to be."

After reprising Jesse Pinkman for two episodes in Better Call Saul, Paul said he felt confident that this marked Jesse's final appearances and called it a farewell to his character.

== Reception ==
=== Critical reception ===
Jesse's character development has received universal acclaim. Alan Sepinwall noticed a gradual shift of the audience's sympathies from Walt to Jesse, who had received mixed reception in the first season. Aaron Paul thinks some of the major turnaround episodes for this are "Peekaboo" and "ABQ". In his review for "Peekaboo," Erik Kain of Forbes wrote that as Walt grows increasingly less sympathetic, Jesse grows more human and complex, as evidenced by his relationship with the neglected son of two drug addicts. Emma Rosenblum of New York Magazine wrote that Jesse started as an "absurd screwup" with a "defiant gait" and the bravado of a wannabe gangster. Her opinion changed beginning with "Peekaboo". Gilligan said the writers' decision to write that episode was to get into Jesse's mind-set. Emily Nussbaum of The New Yorker noted that "Gilligan "swivel[ed] background characters into the spotlight, where they can absorb the sympathy we once extended to Walt." Critics thought "Blood Money" expanded Jesse's role as a contrast to Walt's and the moral conscience of the series. The Hollywood Reporter's Tim Goodman also noted Jesse's role and character development as a contrast to Walt's. Alyssa Rosenberg of ThinkProgress contrasts Walt with Jesse's growing moral conscience.

Seth Amitin of IGN wrote of the episode: though Jesse was close to rock bottom, he still could not admit or accept his problems. Amitin called Jesse the "coward in all of us in tough situations". Amitin was, nonetheless, sympathetic to Jesse's pain, misery, and feelings of meaninglessness, in part because of Paul's "fantastic acting". In his review for "Breakage," Amitin wrote that the episode "rehumaniz[ed] Jesse". He noted that though Jesse is rebuilding his life, he has not learned from his mistakes.

Jesse's role in "Full Measure" garnered positive reviews. Tim Goodman of the San Francisco Chronicle called the episode "an exclamation mark on the tortured journey of Jesse." Entertainment Weekly called "Full Measure" one of Jesse's best episodes and noted his killing Gale cost Jesse the last of his innocence. Quentin B. Huff of PopMatters called Jesse's story arc an "emotional rollercoaster animated by intense grief."

Michael Arbeiter praised Paul's performance in "Box Cutter," calling him "phenomenal" despite barely speaking any dialogue in the episode. Seth Amitin, reviewing for IGN, called Paul's performance in "Problem Dog" as "the performance of the series". Myles McNutt of Cultural Learnings praised Paul's performance in the episode, observing: "Jesse descends further into a place from which he might never escape." USA Today's Robert Bianco wrote of the character in his review for "Blood Money": "Aaron Paul's Jesse, the show's sometimes wonky moral compass, only has to leave a room to set your nerves on edge, wondering what will happen when he returns. That's a tribute to the writers, obviously, but it's also a tribute to Paul, who always seems to be on the verge of either imploding or exploding – and may even be able to pull off both at once. I wouldn't assume he can't."

Aaron Paul's reprisal of the role in El Camino: A Breaking Bad Movie also drew positive reviews. Judy Berman of Time called his portrayal "mesmerizing", citing Paul's ease at "fully re-inhabiting a role he hadn't played for years ... endowing Jesse with the same mix of (waning) goofiness and (escalating) existential terror that propelled him through the finale". Liz Shannon Miller elaborated, in her review from The Verge, that "[Paul's] work in El Camino is staggering, given the high difficulty factor that comes with having to play so many variations of this character" and followed this by stating "what makes El Camino so compelling is the way it engages with how he's changed since those early days".

In an interview with David Whitehouse of The Guardian, Paul remarked on his character's popularity with Breaking Bad fans: "It's crazy [that people side with Jesse]. At the beginning, everyone – including me – saw him as just a drug burn-out. A kid with no sorta brains. But as each episode was revealed to everybody, it showed quite the opposite. It's incredible how Walt and Jesse are completely trading positions. Walt has no morals whatsoever any more, and Jesse, who wants to try to be good, is terrified of him."

Robert Downs Schultz of PopMatters notes that while Jesse and Walt are both murderous liars, thieves, con-men, and drug dealers filled with selfishness and a desire for respect, only Jesse feels it. While both characters damage the lives of their loved ones, only Jesse is consumed by guilt, remorse, and self-hatred. Schultz writes that Jesse knows he is a bad person who can never properly repent for his sins. A life of crime, however, seems to be the only way for Jesse to not be a failure. Schultz disagrees, saying that Jesse is not simply the "conscience of the show, the moral center, the heart," but rather a more complex character.

Alyssa Rosenberg of ThinkProgress deemed Jesse and Walt's relationship "powerful because of its contradictions rather than its clarity." Walt is a paternal figure to Jesse, but a manipulative, "judging, brow-beating, perpetually disappointed" one, making their relationship more tragic than anything else. Donna Bowman of The A.V. Club remarked that in freeing his ambitions from Walter White's manipulations during El Camino, Jesse found his own redemption and avoided his mentor's fate, finally giving himself a chance for a future.

=== Awards ===
In 2010, 2012, and 2014, Aaron Paul won the Primetime Emmy Award for Outstanding Supporting Actor in a Drama Series, and was nominated in 2009 and 2013. Paul won for the episodes "Half Measures" (2010), "End Times" (2012), and "Confessions" (2014).

In addition, Paul won the Saturn Award for Best Supporting Actor on Television in 2010 and 2012. In 2010, Paul was nominated for the Television Critics Association Award for Individual Achievement in Drama and the Satellite Award for Best Supporting Actor in a Series, Miniseries, or Television Film for the third season.

In 2012, Paul was nominated for the Critics' Choice Television Award for Best Supporting Actor in a Drama Series for the fourth season but lost to fellow Breaking Bad cast member Giancarlo Esposito. Paul would later win the award in 2014, for the show's second half of the final season.

In 2014, Paul received his first Golden Globe Award nomination for Best Supporting Actor in a Series, Miniseries, or Television Film for the final season, losing to Jon Voight for the first season of Ray Donovan. However, on February 23, 2014, Paul won the Satellite Award for Best Supporting Actor in a Series, Miniseries, or Television Film for the final season. On June 19, 2014, Paul won the Critics' Choice Television Award for Best Supporting Actor in a Drama Series for the final season. On June 26, 2014, Paul won his third and final Saturn Award for his portrayal of Jesse Pinkman for the final season, making him the only actor to win this award three times.

In 2019, Paul was nominated again for a Satellite Award for his reprisal as Jesse Pinkman in El Camino: A Breaking Bad Movie, this time for Best Actor in a Miniseries or Television Film, but lost to Jared Harris for Chernobyl. In 2021, he received his final nomination for the role in El Camino for the Saturn Award for Best Actor in a Film, but lost to John David Washington for Tenet.

== Legacy ==
Walter White and Jesse Pinkman are parodied as "Woolter and Jesse" in the 2016 Walt Disney Pictures animated film Zootopia, voiced by John DiMaggio, using a subway car as a laboratory to illegally grow Night Howlers, converting it into a blue serum intended to turn the anthropomorphised animals of the world "wild". Co-directors Byron Howard and Rich Moore described the characters' inclusion as "the accidental manifestation of years of using [Breaking Bad] as an example to describe the climactic scene [where Nick and Judy find] the nighthowler flowers being distilled into a serum [and] as we kept building the scene and designing it, we kept saying, well, there's nothing really offensive about this. It's a ram growing flowers in an abandoned train car, making a chemical serum. It evokes a show from pop culture, but it's not like it's something that's offensive to the audience".

Jesse Pinkman and Walter White make silent cameo appearances in the August 2017 Camp Camp episode "Cookin' Cookies", as they are threatened by Sasha and the rest of Flower Scouts Troop #789 for the "competition" their meth sales are bringing against their own drug-infused cookie sales.

Bronze statues of Jesse Pinkman and Walter White were commissioned and donated by creator Vince Gilligan and Sony Pictures Television to the city of Albuquerque in July 2022, which are housed in the Albuquerque Convention Center.

== See also ==
- List of characters in the Breaking Bad franchise
