= Black and Blue (Better Call Saul) =

- Better Call Saul episode
- Promotional poster
- Episode no.: Season 6 Episode 5
- Directed by: Melissa Bernstein
- Written by: Alison Tatlock
- Cinematography by: Marshall Adams
- Editing by: Skip Macdonald
- Original air date: May 9, 2022
- Running time: 51 minutes

Guest appearances
- Ed Begley Jr. as Clifford Main; Jessie Ennis as Erin Brill; Tina Parker as Francesca Liddy; Keiko Agena as Viola Goto; Harrison Thomas as Lyle; Andrea Sooch as Margarethe Ziegler; Lennie Loftin as Genidowski

Episode chronology
← Previous "Hit and Run"	Next → "Axe and Grind"
- Better Call Saul season 6

"Black and Blue" is the fifth episode of the sixth season of Better Call Saul, the spin-off television series of Breaking Bad. Melissa Bernstein directed the episode written by Alison Tatlock. The episode aired on May 9, 2022, on AMC and AMC+. In several countries outside the United States and Canada, the episode premiered on Netflix the following day.

In the episode, Howard Hamlin catches on to Jimmy McGill's constant attempts at sabotage and challenges him to a boxing match. Also, Jimmy reemploys his former receptionist Francesca Liddy to work at his new law offices. Meanwhile, Lalo Salamanca travels to Germany to speak with Werner Ziegler's widow Margarethe.

"Black and Blue" was met with generally positive reviews from critics. Bernstein's direction, Tony Dalton's performance as Lalo, and the opening scene received praise. Several reviewers noted the series's patience and attention to detail to set up important plot points that would appear later in the season. An estimated 1.22 million viewers saw the episode during its first broadcast on AMC.

== Plot ==
=== Opening ===
A technician casts an acrylic block encasing a wooden slide rule. He engraves the message "In Liebe ...Deine Jungs" (German for "With Love ...Your Boys"), applies a manufacturer's label, and places the finished sculpture in a velvet-lined box.

=== Main story ===
Kim Wexler continues to keep from Jimmy McGill the news that Lalo Salamanca might be alive. Jimmy continues to attract a large criminal law clientele and persuades Francesca Liddy to begin work as his administrative assistant. Kim meets with Viola Goto, her former paralegal, to apologize for abruptly leaving Schweikart & Cokely. (Note: As seen in "Bad Choice Road".) Viola tells Kim how much she admires Kim's pro bono work, however, the meeting is a ploy Kim uses to obtain the name of the retired judge who will mediate the Sandpiper case.

Howard Hamlin, Clifford Main, and Erin Brill persuade the Sandpiper clients not to settle. Afterward, Cliff confronts Howard over his supposed use of drugs and prostitutes. Howard realizes Jimmy is sabotaging him. He tricks Jimmy into meeting him at a boxing gym and challenges him to fight. Jimmy initially declines to enter the ring but changes his mind. Howard defeats him, then says he hopes this ends Jimmy's harassment. After he leaves the gym, Howard tells his private investigator to begin surveilling Jimmy. Jimmy later questions his judgment for accepting Howard's challenge, but Kim reassures him their scheme to ruin Howard is proceeding as planned.

Gus Fring's firm belief that Lalo is alive causes him sleeplessness and distractions at work. Mike Ehrmantraut and Gus visit the construction site of the planned meth lab, which Gus carefully inspects before hiding a handgun in the track of an excavator.

In Germany under an alias, Lalo approaches Werner Ziegler's widow Margarethe at a bar. Margarethe believes that Werner died saving his crew from a cave-in and mentions that he referred to his crew as his "boys". Lalo and Margarethe go back to her house and part ways. The next morning, he breaks in after she leaves for work. He finds the "Your Boys" sculpture and makes note of the name on the maker's label. Margarethe unexpectedly returns, but Lalo escapes unseen.

== Production ==
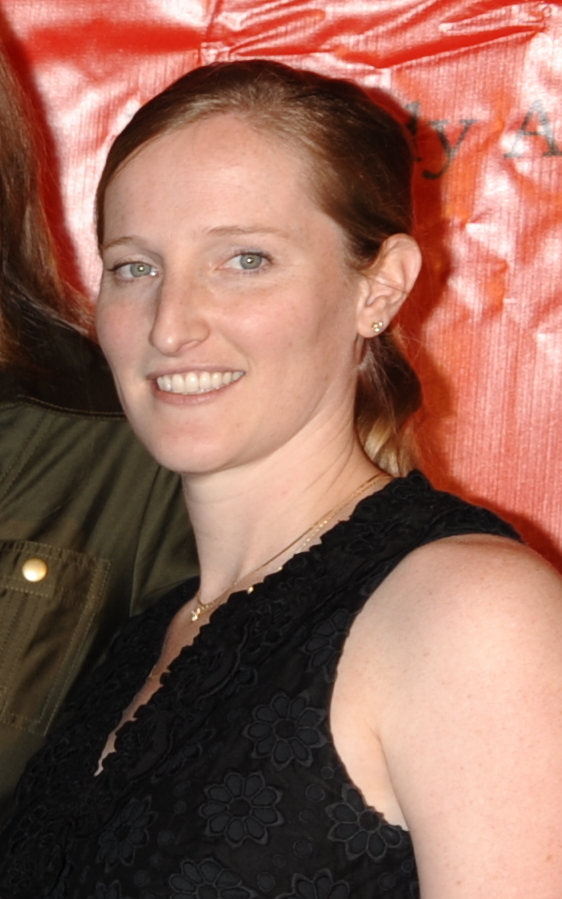
Melissa Bernstein directed "Black and Blue"

"Black and Blue" is the second episode of Better Call Saul directed by executive producer Melissa Bernstein after the fifth season's "JMM", which was also written by Alison Tatlock. The episode marks the return of Tina Parker as Francesca Liddy, not seen since her brief fourth season appearance. The production team created the opening scene showing the manufacture of the acrylic gift for Werner by examining a video tutorial of the real process and then developing shots that simulated it. The song that plays over the sequence is Johannes Brahms's "In Stiller Nacht", performed by Pink Martini and The von Trapps.

Odenkirk and Fabian performed about 80 percent of the boxing sequence themselves. Production staff initially worked out the details with stunt coordinator Al Goto and fight coordinator Luis Moncada (who plays Marco Salamanca) knowing the limitations the actors would have. Odenkirk and Fabian were then trained on the appropriate moves for two to three weeks; Bernstein had been concerned that Odenkirk's training from his action film Nobody would impact his performance, but Odenkirk was able to hold back. The crew looked at a number of boxing rings, one of which was owned by Johnny Tapia, a former world champion boxer from Albuquerque, but those did not suit their needs. As a result, the sequence was shot on a boxing ring constructed under the supervision of production designer Denise Pizzini and set decorator Ashley Michelle Marsh. The boxing ring was placed in a studio instead of a gym because the crew wanted to give themselves the space to create overhead shots. The boxing sequence and the opening scene were shot simultaneously on nearby sets with different cameramen. The episode features the return of Lalo Salamanca, absent since the season premiere. The writers, wanting his arrival in Germany to be believable, discussed showing him taking a boat or using a fake passport to travel overseas but they decided against it, instead choosing to not show the character for several episodes to leave his mode of transportation open for interpretation.

The strip mall location of Jimmy's office had, since the end of Breaking Bad, been leased by a few sports bars and a saloon, but by the time Better Call Saul had been ready to shoot there, the property had become vacant. The floor and the walls were covered up by the art department to hide everything underneath them. Scenes set outside of the location were shot ahead of time during the production of the fourth episode. The inclusion of the toilet in the vacant office was Vince Gilligan's idea, based on a thirty-year-old story where he and his friend were checking out an apartment in Richmond, Virginia. Inside, they noticed a toilet in the middle of the living room that had been used, which they thought was hilarious because the landlord refused to acknowledge its presence until they brought it up. The scene in Gus's garage where Mike exits from the trunk of a vehicle was a continuous shot executed by fastening a camera to the garage door. The shot was engineered by Bernstein and her husband, a camera operator. The scenes at Margarethe's home were filmed at an Albuquerque house with exteriors and interiors the production crew felt looked reasonably European, while Werner's office was created on set. A wide time-lapse shot in the episode, where Margarethe leaves her home to board a tram-train, took months to create. Everything in the shot, except for Margarethe's house and the people, were visual effects added in during post-production by Rodeo FX. The scenes taking place in the underground laboratory construction site were filmed weeks after the rest of "Black and Blue", because the crew had difficulty booking stage space for the set which, according to Bernstein, was an "extremely complicated set to put together".

== Reception ==
=== Critical response ===
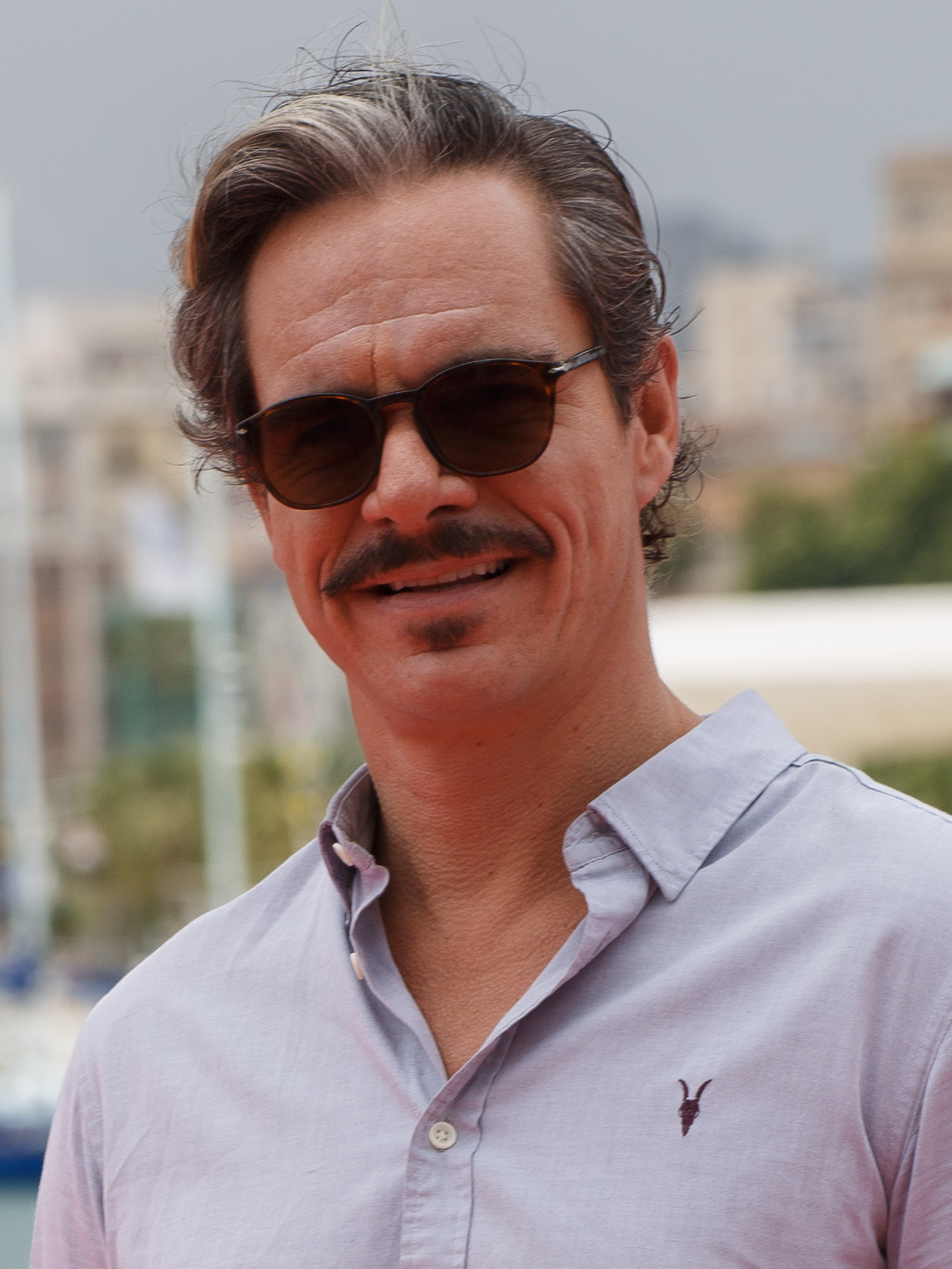
Tony Dalton's performance as Lalo in "Black and Blue" was well received by critics.

On the review aggregator website Rotten Tomatoes, 100% of six reviews are positive, with an average rating of 8.3/10. Rolling Stone's Alan Sepinwall drew parallels between Howard and Gus, both men "being threatened by familiar opponents about whom they can do precious little at the moment". He gave positive notes to the show's creative team for waiting until "Black and Blue" to reintroduce Lalo. He noted the "prequel problem" of watching Lalo at work when viewers know of his absence in Breaking Bad, though he mentioned how "Lalo appears to be in control right now". Sepinwall also praised Melissa Bernstein for her direction, writing that she "makes her presence felt". Steve Greene, in his review for IndieWire, said Kim's meeting with Viola was her "doing what every character in 'Black and Blue' is being forced to do: confront their own worst tendencies head-on". He compared Lalo and Margarethe's scenes to Before Sunrise, calling it the "biggest Better Call Saul curveball this week", and applauded Tony Dalton's performance as Lalo, writing, "Dalton doesn't have to drop the charm offensive for the audience to be reminded of his ruthlessness with each part of the truth he leaves out." Greene gave the episode an A− rating and said, "This show has been painting a painful endgame for a while. Watching all its players realize just how much it will cost them (and everyone else) continues to be one of the more gut-wrenching parts of it all."

The A.V. Club's Kimberly Potts delivered some criticism to the amount of exposition, comparing it to past episodes such as "Alpine Shepherd Boy", "Bali Ha'i", "Sabrosito", "Talk", and "Dedicado a Max", but said she nevertheless enjoyed the episode for allowing viewers to acknowledge where the characters are and where they might be by the end of the season. Scott Tobias, writing for Vulture, said "Black and Blue" was "one of those episodes that's nearly all craft, a careful setting of the table for the payoffs to come". He complimented the cold open for having "a statement of purpose, a respect for the fine-hued details of the creative process and a conviction that viewers will have the patience to appreciate their rendering". Michael Hogan of Vanity Fair made note of the high levels of lore packed into the episode. He also described the boxing scene as "one of those semi-brilliant, semi-absurd set pieces that you can imagine a writer's room deciding to go ahead with because, hey, it's the last season and why the hell not?"

=== Ratings ===
An estimated 1.22 million viewers watched "Black and Blue" during its first broadcast on AMC on May 9, 2022.

=== Accolades ===
At the 74th Primetime Emmy Awards, Thomas Golubić received a nomination for Outstanding Music Supervision for his work on "Black and Blue".
