= Axe and Grind =

- Better Call Saul episode
- Promotional poster
- Episode no.: Season 6 Episode 6
- Directed by: Giancarlo Esposito
- Written by: Ariel Levine
- Cinematography by: Paul Donachie
- Editing by: Chris McCaleb
- Original air date: May 16, 2022
- Running time: 46 minutes

Guest appearances
- Ed Begley, Jr. as Clifford Main; Kerry Condon as Stacey Ehrmantraut; Ray Campbell as Tyrus Kitt; Josh Fadem as Joey Dixon; Sandrine Holt as Cheryl Hamlin; John Ennis as Lenny; Tina Parker as Francesca Liddy; Joe DeRosa as Dr. Caldera; Hayley Holmes as The Make-Up Girl; Stefan Kapičić as Casper; Lennie Loftin as Genidowski; John Posey as Rand Casimiro; Beth Hoyt as Mrs. Wexler; Katie Beth Hall as Young Kim Wexler; John Hartmann as Mr. Pearson; Karen Maruyama as Judge Metcalf

Episode chronology
← Previous "Black and Blue"	Next → "Plan and Execution"
- Better Call Saul season 6

"Axe and Grind" is the sixth episode of the sixth season of Better Call Saul, the spin-off television series of Breaking Bad. Actor Giancarlo Esposito directed the episode written by Ariel Levine. The episode aired on May 16, 2022, on AMC and AMC+. In several countries outside the United States and Canada, the episode premiered on Netflix the following day.

In the episode, Jimmy McGill and Kim Wexler finish their preparations for "D-Day" in their attempt to ruin Howard Hamlin's career, but the plan hits an unexpected obstacle. Lalo Salamanca tracks down one of Werner Ziegler's construction crew in Germany and prepares to interrogate him about the crew's work for Gus Fring. "Axe and Grind" was the television directorial debut of Esposito, who stars in the series as Gus but does not appear in the episode.

"Axe and Grind" was met with positive reviews for its writing, direction, pacing, cinematography, and on-screen performances, most notably that of Rhea Seehorn as Kim. An estimated 1.13 million viewers saw the episode during its first broadcast on AMC.

== Plot ==
=== Opening ===
In a flashback to the 1980s, Kim Wexler's mother feigns outrage after Kim is caught shoplifting jewelry. After the store manager allows them to leave, Kim's mother shows her pride and reveals that she stole the necklace and earrings Kim tried to take. (Note: Kim is seen wearing the same triangle-shaped earrings throughout the series.)

=== Main story ===
In a strained conversation, Howard Hamlin tells his wife Cheryl he is attempting to solve Jimmy McGill's harassment campaign. Howard's investigator reports that the only variation to Jimmy and Kim's regular routine was Jimmy's recent $20,000 cash withdrawal.

Jimmy and Kim visit Dr. Caldera's veterinary clinic, where they test a mydriatic intended for use in their scheme against Howard. Caldera explains his plan to quit as the middleman for Albuquerque's criminals and shows them his encrypted "black book" of underworld contacts he intends to sell off. (Note: The book first appeared in a flashforward during the opening sequence of "Wine and Roses". It is shown to contain the business card of vacuum store owner Ed Galbraith, the "disappearer".) Tyrus Kitt confronts Mike Ehrmantraut about how Mike is employing his security teams during the hunt for Lalo Salamanca; Mike refuses to divert the men watching his family.

In Germany, the label from the Lucite sculpture he observed at Margarethe Ziegler's home leads Lalo to Casper's house. Casper strikes Lalo with the blunt side of an axe, but Lalo uses a razor blade to slash Casper's face and the axe to sever Casper's foot. Lalo gives Casper his belt for a tourniquet, then prepares to interrogate him about his work with Werner Ziegler.

Clifford Main invites Kim to a Santa Fe luncheon to meet representatives of a foundation that funds programs similar to her pro bono work. Kim is worried that the meeting is scheduled for "D-Day", the day they execute their plan against Howard, but Jimmy assures her she does not need to be present for it to work. Jimmy works with his film crew to photograph an actor made up to resemble Sandpiper case mediator Rand Casimiro. Francesca Liddy calls Hamlin, Hamlin and McGill and poses as the family member of a Sandpiper plaintiff to obtain conference call details for the upcoming mediation session. On D-Day, Jimmy goes to purchase a bottle of Zafiro Añejo tequila (Note: The fictional brand was first seen in "Switch".) but is surprised to see Casimiro at the liquor store, with his arm in a cast, something not depicted in the fake photographs. Jimmy calls Kim to suggest aborting the plan and regrouping after her Santa Fe meeting. She insists their plan be executed that day, violently turns her car around, and heads back to Albuquerque.

== Production ==
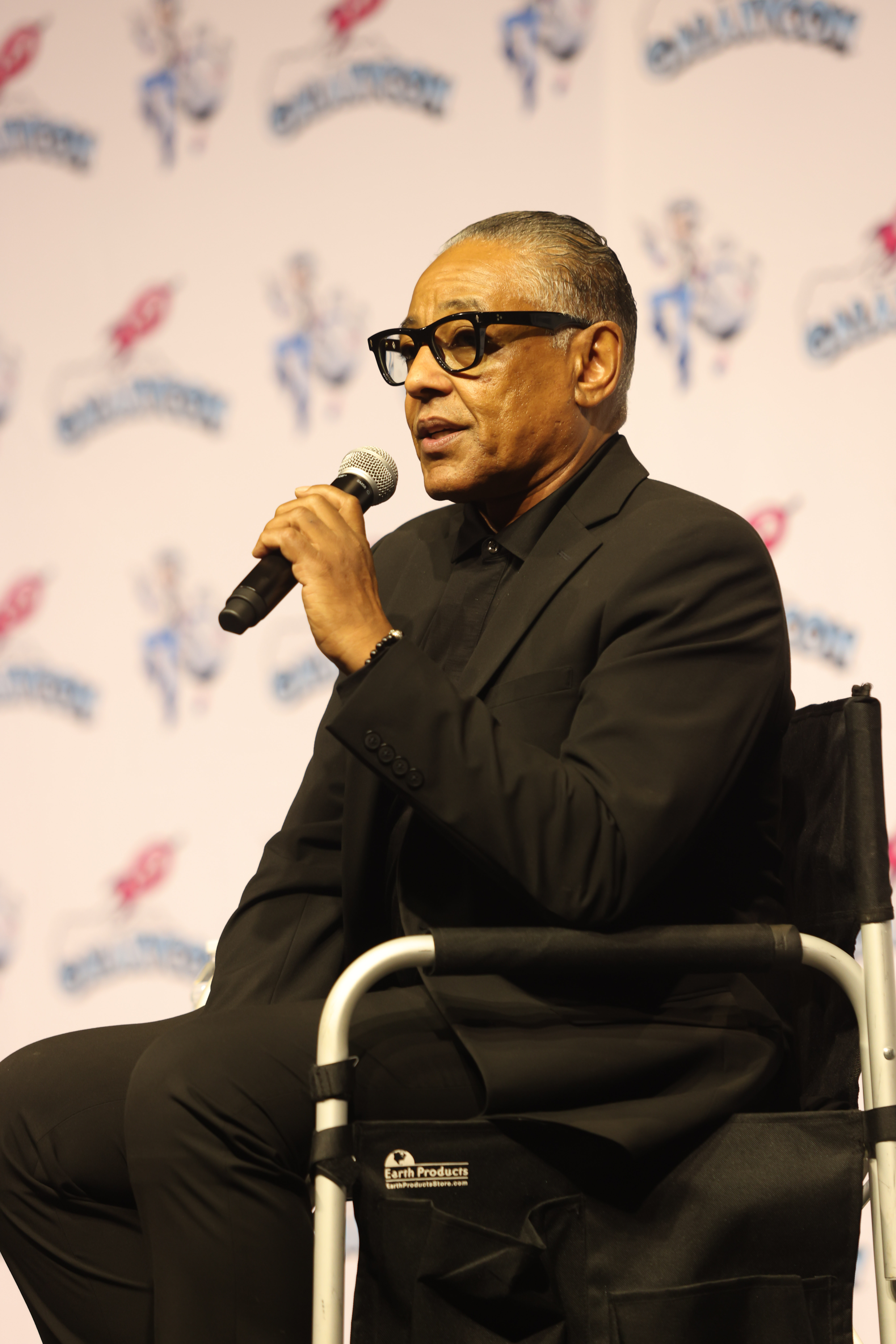
"Axe and Grind" was directed by series regular Giancarlo Esposito, who does not appear in the episode.

The episode was directed by Giancarlo Esposito, who plays Gus Fring, marking his television directorial debut. He is the second Better Call Saul cast member to direct an episode of the series after Rhea Seehorn (who plays Kim Wexler) directed the season's fourth episode, "Hit and Run". Unlike "Hit and Run", which prominently featured Seehorn's character, Esposito did not appear in "Axe and Grind". The actor said he had sent Vince Gilligan a copy of his second film around the time they were filming "Box Cutter" in Breaking Bad in hopes he could direct, but Gilligan did not have time to review it then. Esposito was surprised when Gilligan approached him ten years later to direct this episode. He said the producers had chosen him for the episode because it matched his personality. The episode also marks the debut of Ariel Levine as a solo writer; she previously co-wrote the Better Call Saul episodes "Something Unforgivable" and "Carrot and Stick". Furthermore, "Axe and Grind" featured John Ennis as Lenny, the actor hired to impersonate retired judge Rand Casimiro. Ennis was a cast member on the sketch comedy series Mr. Show with Bob and David starring Bob Odenkirk, who plays Jimmy McGill. His daughter Jessie Ennis made several appearances on Better Call Saul in the recurring role of Erin Brill, the law firm associate at Davis & Main; they appear together in the next episode.

As an actor, Esposito had not watched every episode of Breaking Bad or Better Call Saul, nor binged any show on television, because he believed it would affect his performances on screen. To direct the episode, however, he broke his "golden rule" by watching Werner Ziegler's death in the Better Call Saul episode "Winner". His approach as director was to minimize the dialogue and instead convey the same information visually, especially through facial expressions. Esposito explained that Better Call Saul rarely used flashbacks unless they were meaningful, and for this episode, the flashback to Kim's childhood in the opening scene established several elements of her character. The triangular earrings her mother stole were worn by Kim throughout the series, which Esposito said Kim used to remind herself of the scam her mother had pulled and that she should not do the same. While preparing to shoot the scene, Esposito learned how important the cinematography was to the storytelling on Better Call Saul. He originally wanted to film the parking lot sequence as a crane shot that would lift away from and lower back toward the characters as they talked. He communicated his idea to cameraman Matt Credle, who told him they would not execute it as it did not fit within the show's established visual language. Esposito explained, "I started to learn the visual language that is the show outside of being a viewer, from actually being in action. They didn't give me the crane, and I didn't mind. I shot it a different way."

There was a shortened amount of preparation for Lalo's scenes because the crew had to work around the schedule of German actor Stefan Kapičić, who plays Casper. Those scenes were shot on Esposito's first day on set. The exterior shots of Casper's home in Germany were filmed near a private home with a horse barn near Sandia, New Mexico. Since the greenery was not as lush as Esposito wanted, the crew planted extra trees and helped to water the grounds for two weeks before shooting began. Interior shots were filmed on an existing set at Albuquerque Studios. The scenes with Lalo and Casper were inspired by the stylized violence in films such as A History of Violence (2005), Straw Dogs (1971), and McCabe & Mrs. Miller (1971). Esposito wanted Lalo's use of the axe to cut Casper's leg to happen so quickly that viewers would only have time to question what had happened. The closing shot of Kim making a U-turn was meant to illustrate a major shift in Kim's story, according to Esposito. He saw the shot as an echo of the opening scene, in which her mother first publicly confronts and then privately praises her for stealing, "an analogy of part of her whole life". The crew was able to find a segment of road with two parallel strips and an area to perform the U-turn stunt. The scene was shot using a crane mounted on a Porsche Cayenne. The day was overcast during the filming of these takes, which Esposito said helped to add to the sense of foreboding and weight to Kim's choice.

== Reception ==
=== Critical response ===
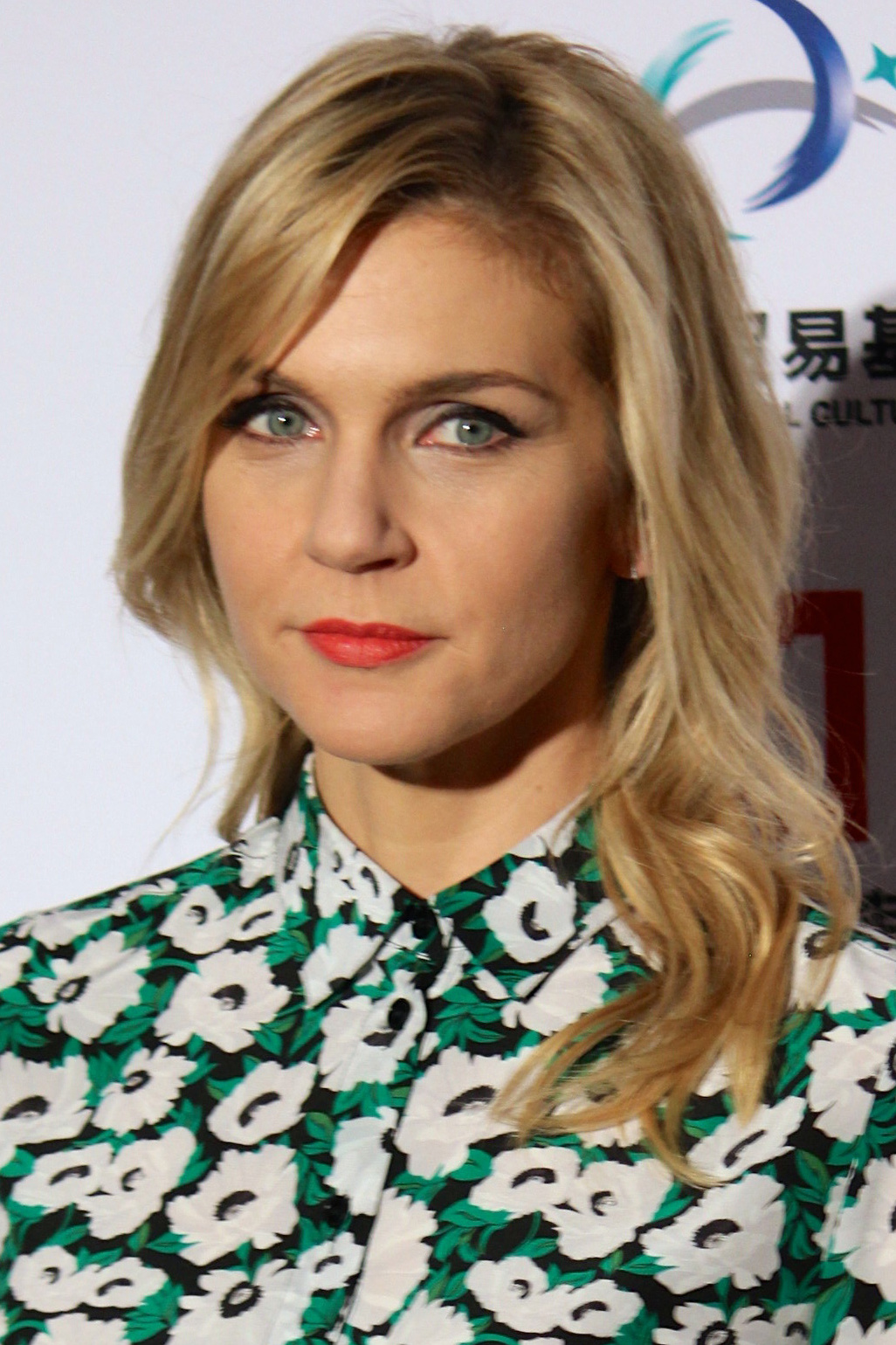
Rhea Seehorn's performance in the episode received praise.

On the review aggregator website Rotten Tomatoes, 100% of six reviews are positive, with an average rating of 8.3/10. Alan Sepinwall of Rolling Stone compared the episode's cold open to the opening scene of the fifth season episode "Wexler v. Goodman", which also included a flashback to Kim's past, calling them "hugely informative to who Kim is now". He was positive of Seehorn's performance, the cinematography, and the final scene where Kim decided to return to Albuquerque. Sepinwall also noted the episode's slow pace but stated his belief that viewers would be rewarded for their patience with future episodes. IndieWire's Steve Greene said he liked Esposito's direction, Levine's screenplay, and the production design of Howard's kitchen. He awarded the episode a "B+". The A.V. Club's Kimberly Potts gave it an "A−" and compared Kim's development in the episode to that of Walter White's development throughout Breaking Bad, asking if they were always destined to be immoral characters even before breaking bad: "Perhaps that question, considering the nuance Saul has spun for her, can be applied to Kim, who just wants to do good but is willing to do some not-so-good things to achieve that end."

Writing for Vulture, Scott Tobias complimented the use of Duran Duran's song "The Reflex" during the opening scene. He called the episode "another carefully plotted hour ahead of next week's half-season finale". Kaleena Rivera from Pajiba gave praise to Patrick Fabian's performance as Howard and the final scene. She said seeing Kim "choose the con over her pro bono dream is a watershed moment in the series". Rivera also made note of the pacing and said, "If this was any other show, I would guess the audience would start to become weary, but as it stands, this is more about impatience for what's to come rather than any perceived slowness." In his recap of the episode, Michael Hogan of Vanity Fair said "this episode may not have provided any kind of closure, but it at least brought us closer to understanding the contours of Kim and Jimmy's plan".

=== Ratings ===
An estimated 1.13 million viewers watched "Axe and Grind" during its first broadcast on AMC on May 16, 2022.
