= Wolfboy and the Everything Factory =

Animated television series

- Created by: Toff Mazery; Edward Jesse
- Based on: Characters by Toff Mazery
- Developed by: Michael Ryan; Toff Mazery; Edward Jesse
- Voices of: Kassian Ahktar; Lilly Williams; Archie Yates; Joseph Gordon-Levitt
- Theme music composer: Clap! Clap!
- Composer: Xav Clarke
- Countries of origin: United Kingdom; United States
- Original language: English
- No. of seasons: 2
- No. of episodes: 20

Production
- Executive producers: Joseph Gordon-Levitt; Jared Geller; Scott Greenberg; Joel Kuwahara; Toff Mazery; Edward Jesse; Michael Ryan
- Running time: 24-26 min.
- Production companies: Toff's Tiny Universe; HitRecord; Bento Box Entertainment

Original release
- Network: Apple TV+
- Release: September 24, 2021 – September 30, 2022

Wolfboy and the Everything Factory is an animated television series created by Toff Mazery and Edward Jesse for Apple TV+. It premiered on 24 September 2021 as part of a slate of autumn children's series. Season 2 was released on 30 September 2022.

== Plot ==
The series follows Wolfboy, an imaginative oddball who discovers a strange realm at the centre of the earth where fantastical beings called 'Sprytes' create things for the world on the surface - clouds, trees, rabbits, dreams, hiccups, memories, time... everything. With the help of his newfound Spryte friends, Xandra and Sprout, Wolfboy learns that not only can he use the creative energy of the Everything Factory to make his wild imagination come to life, but that he is destined to play a central role in an age-old battle between the forces of creation and destruction. He soon comes to realize that being different is what makes him special - and that, ultimately, it's the oddballs and dreamers who change the world.

== Voice cast ==
=== Main characters ===
- Kassian Akhtar as William Wolfe "Wolfboy"
- Archie Yates as Sprout Figwort
- Lilly Williams as Xandra
- Cristina Milizia as Floof
- Joseph Gordon-Levitt as Professor Luxcraft
- Abigail Estrella as Seth

=== Supporting characters ===
- Berrett Huntsman as Oneira "Oni"
- Nevin Kar as Blip
- Isabella Russo as Tali
- Flula Borg as Gamekeeper
- Courtenay Taylor as Athena
- Juno Temple as Nyx
- Kevin Michael Richardson as Klaybottom
- Maurice LaMarche as Faradox
- Joel Gelman as Serebrin
- Mae Whitman as Wuji

=== Other characters ===
- Thomas Lennon as Professor Rabscuttle
- Jason Maybaum as Sneffton
- John Lithgow as Professor Chronopher
- Georgia King as William's Mom
- Jo Firestone
- Melanie Paxson as Antler
- Kirby Howell-Baptiste as Flora Figwort
- Kimberly Brooks
- Moira Quirk as Amelia "Millie" Springhaart
- Justin Vivian Bond as Astralynx "Star Creature"
- Monia Ayachi as Mademoiselle Glaçon
- Flula Borg as Monsieur Snjor
- Zehra Fazal as Professor Pigment
- BJ Ward as Celorain
- David Attenborough as Seapinch
- Maria Bamford as Sky Ancient
- Henry Winkler as Mountain Ancient
- Tony Hale as Water Ancient
- Lorraine Toussaint as Forest Ancient

== Episodes ==
Season	Episodes	Originally released
1	10	September 24, 2021
2	10	September 30, 2022

=== Season 1 (2021) ===
No. overall	No. in season	Title	Original release date
1	1	"Wolfboy Finds Adventure"	September 24, 2021
Wolfboy spies curious-looking creatures at his new boarding school and follows them down a glowing portal.
2	2	"Wolfboy Gets a Bed" "Wolfboy Makes a Blunder"	September 24, 2021
"Wolfboy Gets a Bed": Sprytes from the rival dorm challenge Wolfboy to complete the risky star trial. "Wolfboy Makes a Blunder": Wolfboy creates a peculiar little friend.
3	3	"There's Trouble in the Wood" "Sprout Makes the Team"	September 24, 2021
"There's Trouble in the Wood": Wolfboy, Xandra, and Sprout volunteer to care for sick trees. "Sprout Makes the Team": A spryte game between dorms brings out Xandra's competitive side.
4	4	"Losing Track of Time" "Chaos Comes to Class"	September 24, 2021
"Losing Track of Time": The gang goes on a time-traveling adventure to undo Wolfboy's mistake. "Chaos Comes to Class": A disarray attack unleashes something remarkable in Wolfboy.
5	5	"Wolfboy Finds a Memory"	September 24, 2021
Wolfboy, Xandra, and Sprout sneak into the Memory Maze to find out why Luxcraft's pendant is so familiar to Wolfboy.
6	6	"Wolfboy Goes Home" "Wolfboy Makes a Snowflake"	September 24, 2021
"Wolfboy Goes Home": Xandra and Sprout join Wolfboy on his trip home to see his mother. "Wolfboy Makes a Snowflake": Wolfboy helps Blip find his confidence.
7	7	"Grandmother Tells a Story" "Grandmother Loses Her Crown"	September 24, 2021
"Grandmother Tells a Story": Wolfboy visits Xandra and Sprout's home to celebrate Elderspryte Day. "Grandmother Loses Her Crown": Grandmother Figwort's beloved crown is stolen.
8	8	"Nobody Started It!" "Wolfboy Begins His Training"	September 24, 2021
"Nobody Started It!": Dorm rivalry reaches peak silliness with an all-out prank war. "Wolfboy Begins His Training": Luxcraft begins training Wolfboy to harness his powers.
9	9	"We Laugh and Cry" "We Don't Know Who to Trust"	September 24, 2021
"We Laugh and Cry": Wolfboy's secret training leaves him no time to focus on the Laugh Lab assignment. "We Don't Know Who to Trust": Wolfboy tells his friends the truth about everything.
10	10	"Wolfboy Follows His Dreams"	September 24, 2021
An intense dream causes Wolfboy to sleepwalk toward a forbidden area, so the gang heads to the Dream Lab for help.

=== Season 2 (2022) ===
No. overall	No. in season	Title	Original release date
11	1	"Wolfboy Takes a Ride" "Wolfboy Talks with Nyx"	September 30, 2022
"Wolfboy Takes a Ride": After Wolfboy enters the infamous passage, it leads him and Floof to the realm of the disarrays. "Wolfboy Talks with Nyx": Wolfboy finally meets Nyx, the leader of the disarrays and tells him that the disarrays are actually good.
12	2	"Nyx Answers a Question" "Wolfboy and Seth Escape"	September 30, 2022
"Nyx Answers a Question": Nyx is teaching Wolfboy how to harness his destruction powers, but he meets a young disarray name Seth who warns him that Nyx is using him to put an end to the sprytes. "Wolfboy and Seth Escape": As Wolfboy, Floof and Seth plan an escape plan to the spryte realm, Serebrin is on their trail to eliminate Wolfboy for good.
13	3	"A Dinosaur Comes for Tea" "Things Seem Unsound"	September 30, 2022
"A Dinosaur Comes for Tea": Xandra and Sprout are having a difficult time with Wolfboy's disarray friend Seth, but just for Sprout when Seth brings a dinosaur from the forbidden lab known as the extinct lab. "Things Seem Unsound": Xandra might be friended with Seth when Seth's destruction powers come to an aid when a disarray has been mixing up the sounds in the sound lab.
14	4	"The Color Fades" "Wolfboy Frolics with the Enemy"	September 30, 2022
"The Color Fades": The disarrays have drained all the colors from a flower valley, so Wolfboy finds a creative way to fill all the colors back. "Wolfboy Frolics With the Enemy": Xandra's favorite comic book series reveals a clue about Wolfboy's prophecy, but he isn't ready yet to show his face to Luxcraft yet.
15	5	"The Bubble Is Popped" "Xandra Finds a Memory"	September 30, 2022
"The Bubble Is Popped": The Sprytes celebrate their most beloved holiday: Bubble Day, but Scurilions manage to ruin the celebration with their secret weapon: the power of fear. "Xandra Finds a Memory": Xandra heads back to the Memory Maze to find her strength and the memory of her parents to defeat Nyx, meanwhile Luxcraft is finally show the Spryte Council about Wolfboy that he is the one to restore balance to the world.
16	6	"Wolfboy Takes the Plunge" "The Stars Are Restored"	September 30, 2022
"Wolfboy Takes the Plunge": After finding out Luxcraft is helping Nyx defend the disarrays, Wolfboy is unsure who to trust meanwhile a broken-hearted Xandra needs to find her destiny to stop Nyx and the disarrays. "The Stars Are Restored": The gang sneak into Luxcraft's office and discover a shocking discovery about the Star Creature is the Astralynx and try to convince her about the prophecy.
17	7	"We Search Above" "We Search Below"	September 30, 2022
"We Search Above": The gang sets off a quest to find the first ancient, but Sprout stays behind to help a critter in need to fix her hang glider. "We Search Below": Seth realizes her true potential as a disarray after meeting the second ancient, the Mountain Ancient.
18	8	"We Search for Balance" "We Search for Change"	September 30, 2022
"We Search for Balance": Wolfboy and the gang must help the Ice Ancient and Steam Ancient resolve an old feud and comebine back into the Water Ancient. "We Search for Change": The Gang finds the final ancient the Forest Ancient (which he claims to be a phony) to get the last wisdom.
19	9	"Wolfboy's Heart to Heart" "The World's in Disarray"	September 30, 2022
"Wolfboy's Heart to Heart": Wolfboy thinks he will have all four wisdoms he can restore balance to the world, but he doesn't until he meets a familiar face to find answers. "The World's in Disarray": As Wolfboy and his friends return to the Everything Factory, they find Nyx returning to the Spryte Realm using the portal Wolfboy made and take over the realm.
20	10	"Something Quite Unexpected Happens"	September 30, 2022
As Wolfboy takes the last stand to defeat Nyx, she gives him two choices: save the world or save his friends.

== Production ==
The animation style for the series is based on the visual art of Toff Mazery. Mazery and Edward Jesse are the series' co-creators, writers, and executive producers with Michael Ryan serving as a showrunner, writer, and executive producer. Also executive producing are Joseph Gordon-Levitt and Jared Geller of HitRecord as well as Scott Greenberg and Joel Kuwahara of Bento Box Entertainment.

== Release ==
Apple TV+ released a trailer on 9 September 2021. The series later premiered on September 24, 2021.

== Reception ==
The series was initially met with overwhelmingly positive reviews, with Cult Of Mac praising the "charm[ing]" show for allowing its characters to express a wide range of emotions and comparing it to Steven Universe and Fatherly noting its unique feel and tone while calling it "the next great weird kids' show". Common Sense Media praised the series as "a true delight", noting the complexity and emotional intelligence of the characters, as well as the "superb" visual world of the Everything Factory.
