= Home Sweet Home Alone =

2021 film by Dan Mazer

- Promotional release poster
- Directed by: Dan Mazer
- Screenplay by: Mikey Day; Streeter Seidell
- Story by: Mikey Day; Streeter Siedell; John Hughes
- Based on: Home Alone by John Hughes
- Produced by: Hutch Parker; Dan Wilson
- Starring: Ellie Kemper; Rob Delaney; Archie Yates; Aisling Bea; Kenan Thompson; Tim Simons; Pete Holmes; Devin Ratray; Ally Maki
- Cinematography: Mitchell Amundsen
- Edited by: David Rennie; Dan Zimmerman
- Music by: John Debney
- Production companies: 20th Century Studios; Hutch Parker Entertainment
- Distributed by: Disney+
- Release date: November 12, 2021
- Running time: 93 minutes
- Country: United States
- Language: English

Home Sweet Home Alone is a 2021 American Christmas comedy film. A standalone sequel to Home Alone: The Holiday Heist (2012), it is the sixth installment overall in the Home Alone franchise. The film was directed by Dan Mazer, written by Mikey Day and Streeter Seidell. The film stars Ellie Kemper, Rob Delaney, Archie Yates, Aisling Bea, Kenan Thompson, Pete Holmes, Devin Ratray (reprising his role as Buzz McCallister from Home Alone (1990) and Home Alone 2: Lost in New York (1992), and Ally Maki, along with co-stars, Chris Parnell, Andy Daly, Mikey Day, Katie Beth Hall and Max Ivutin. The story revolves around a nearly-broke married couple who attempt to steal back a valuable doll they lost. They suspect it was stolen and plan to break into the house of a boy who has been accidentally left home alone.

Home Sweet Home Alone was produced as the first 20th Century Studios film for Disney+. The film was announced after The Walt Disney Company acquired 21st Century Fox and inherited the rights to the Home Alone franchise. Home Sweet Home Alone was released on November 12, 2021 and received negative reviews from critics.

== Plot ==
Jeff and Pam McKenzie are trying to sell their house, but have not told their children, Abby and Chris. Jeff has lost his job and Pam's salary is not enough to keep their home. To make matters worse, Jeff's obnoxious and successful brother Hunter, his wife, Mei, and their son Ollie have decided to stay with them for Christmas.

During an open house, Max Mercer and his mother Carol stop by to use the restroom. Max has a brief exchange with Jeff, during which the latter reveals a box of old dolls, including a malformed one with an upside down face. Carol explains to Jeff that dolls with unusual deformities are rare and worth a lot of money. As Max and Carol return home, the whole family is preparing to leave for Tokyo, Japan, for the holidays, with Carol leaving earlier than the rest. Max, annoyed with the fuss, settles in the garage-parked car to watch cartoons and accidentally falls asleep. Unfortunately, Max's family do not realize that their son was sleeping in the car parked in the garage and left him at home, thinking he was in another vehicle with one of the rest of the members.

Concerned about losing their home, Jeff goes to get the doll only to find it is missing. Believing that Max stole it, he locates the Mercer household the next day only to find the whole family hastily leaving. During the commotion, he overhears the security code and sees where the house key is hidden. Telling Pam about it, they agree to get the doll back at night.

Meanwhile, Max discovers the whole family has left and initially has fun, though he quickly grows bored and misses them. Meanwhile, Jeff and Pam arrive at the Mercer's and get inside. Overhearing them talk about getting an "ugly little boy", Max assumes they are talking about kidnapping and selling him. He attempts to scare them away by calling the police. Officer Buzz McCallister arrives, but Pam diverts him. Max fears if Buzz realizes he is home alone, his parents may get arrested.

Carol discovers Max was left behind and buys a ticket to head back. The McKenzies go to church the next day and run into their realtor. He tells them there is a buyer, but they must decide by the end of the year, which puts extensive pressure on them. Max arrives and unknowingly converses with Jeff and Pam's son Chris who sympathetically gives him his water gun. The couple spot Max talking with someone and assume she is his grandmother. They resolve to break into the house once again while their family is still at church.

Sneaking around the back of the house, Jeff and Pam end up in the neighbor's backyard instead. Max overhears them once again, with Jeff agreeing to arrive dressed as Santa in an effort to fool him. Max responds by booby-trapping the house to cause difficulty and prevent them from getting close to himself while Jeff and Pam wait for their family to fall asleep on Christmas Eve. The couple fall into Max's traps, during which they discover that Max did not steal the doll, but instead a can of soda. They clear up the misunderstanding, but learn Max is home alone and agree to let him stay with them until his mother returns.

As they explain the whole situation to their family, it turns out that Ollie stole the doll and managed to safely retrieve it, thus ensuring that the McKenzies can stay. Carol arrives to pick up Max. Having moved into their house only two months ago, Carol finds friends in the McKenzies and thanks them for taking care of Max.

One year later, the Mercers and McKenzies have Christmas dinner together. Jeff has gotten a new job and willingly gives Max the soda he craved the year prior.

== Cast ==
- Ellie Kemper as Pam McKenzie, Jeff's wife who works as a teacher.
- Rob Delaney as Jeff McKenzie, an out-of-work man who plans to obtain an expensive doll from the Mercers' home.
- Archie Yates as Max Mercer, a boy who is left behind at home by his family.
- Aisling Bea as Carol Mercer, the mother of Max.
- Kenan Thompson as Gavin Washington, a real estate agent.
- Tim Simons as Hunter McKenzie, Jeff's obnoxious and more successful brother.
- Pete Holmes as Uncle Blake Mercer, Max's uncle, and Mike and Stu's brother.
- Devin Ratray as Officer Buzz McCallister, the oldest brother of Kevin McCallister who has become a police officer. Ratray reprises his role from previous entries.
- Ally Maki as Mei, Hunter's wife and Jeff's sister-in-law.
- Chris Parnell as Uncle Stu Mercer, another uncle of Max, the brother of Mike and Blake.
- Andy Daly as Mike Mercer, Carol's husband, and Max's father.
- Mikey Day as Priest
- Katie Beth Hall as Abby McKenzie, Jeff and Pam's daughter.
- Max Ivutin as Chris McKenzie, Jeff and Pam's son.
- Justine Archambault as Young Abby McKenzie
  - Amadeo Correia as Young Chris McKenzie
- Maddie Holliday as Katie Mercer, the sister of Max.
- Aiden & Allan Wang as Ollie, son of Hunter and Mei, and Abby and Chris's cousin.
- Esther Povitsky as Daisy Breckin
- Jordan Carlos as Clem Breckin
- Jim Rash as Bell Choir Leader
- Martin Stone as Grandpa Mercer
- William S. Taylor as Grandpa Burke
- Linda Joyce Nourse as Grandma Burke
- Nick Allan as Santa Claus
- Kristina Klebe as the voice of Homebot.
- John Novak as Johnny
- Eddie G. as Snakes

== Production ==
On August 6, 2019, Disney CEO Bob Iger announced that a new film in the Home Alone franchise, titled simply Home Alone, was in development. By October, Dan Mazer had entered negotiations to direct the film, with a script co-written by Mikey Day and Streeter Seidell, with franchise creator John Hughes receiving posthumous co-writing credit as well. Hutch Parker and Dan Wilson served as producers.

In December 2019, Archie Yates, Rob Delaney, and Ellie Kemper were announced as the co-stars of the film. In July 2020, it was reported that Ally Maki, Kenan Thompson, Chris Parnell, Aisling Bea, Pete Holmes, Timothy Simons, and Mikey Day had joined the cast. In April 2020, it was reported that Macaulay Culkin, who played Kevin McCallister in Home Alone and Home Alone 2: Lost in New York, would reprise his role in a cameo appearance; In October 2021, Culkin denied his involvement in the film. In August 2021, it was announced that Devin Ratray, who played Buzz McCallister in the first two films, would return to the franchise for the first time in nearly 29 years.

Principal photography began in February 2020, in Montreal, Quebec, Canada. In March, filming was halted due to the COVID-19 pandemic and industry restrictions worldwide. In November 2020, Disney announced that all its films that had been postponed by the pandemic had resumed filming, and in some cases completed principal photography. The film was released digitally on Disney+ on November 12, 2021.

== Music ==
The score of the film was composed and conducted by John Debney and performed by the Hollywood Studio Symphony, which incorporates John Williams' themes from the first two films. Two tracks in the score, "He's Hurting Me", and "Who Raised This Monster?", included a reference to Alan Silvestri's theme from the film, Mouse Hunt.

== Release ==
Home Sweet Home Alone premiered on November 12, 2021 on Disney+.

== Reception ==
=== Critical response ===
On the review aggregator website Rotten Tomatoes, 15% of 72 critics' reviews are positive, with an average rating of 3.7/10. The website's consensus reads: "Nobody's Home." Metacritic, which uses a weighted average, assigned the film a score of 35 out of 100, based on 16 critics, indicating "generally unfavorable" reviews.

Benjamin Lee of The Guardian gave the film 3 out of 5 stars and wrote: "Home Sweet Home Alone is a surprisingly entertaining, if wholly unnecessary, sequel, a tangerine where we expected to find a lump of coal." Jennifer Green of Common Sense Media also gave it 3 out of 5 stars and wrote: "By this point, after no fewer than five previous features in the franchise, Home Sweet Home Alone might not have much new to offer. But the characters here have a wholesomeness to them that was missing in some of the earlier films." Aditya Mani Jha of Firstpost rated the film 3 out of 5 stars and wrote: "Overall, Home Sweet Home Alone is a competently mounted but unambitious film. At times, it plays like a showreel from its source material, and the makers are okay with it being that way. This makes it efficient in the blockbuster sense, but even its keenest backers will find it difficult to remember too many of the film's all-new scenarios or one-liners after the end credits roll." Adam Graham of The Detroit News gave it a grade of B− and wrote: "Home Sweet Home Alone holds its own, a new spin on an old tale that keeps the spirit of the original alive."

CNN's Brian Lowry wrote that the film "is a very odd duck -- a movie that basically replicates the three-decades-old "Home Alone" template, but in a way that feels slightly weird and ill-conceived." Tim Robey of The Daily Telegraph gave the film 2 out of 5 stars, writing: "Don't expect a Christmas miracle, then: it's more like a box of Quality Street that got heavily plundered before the wrapping went on." Clarisse Loughrey of The Independent gave the film 1 out of 5 stars, writing: "Home Sweet Home Alone decides, somewhat arbitrarily, to switch everything up – the kid is now an utter arsehole while the burglars are sympathetic, which results in the audience rooting for criminals while really just hoping that everyone would quit it and go to sleep." Kevin Maher of The Times also gave the film 1 out of 5 stars, writing that "everything that happens before the mayhem — the burglary begins after a full hour of padding — is excruciatingly forced." Jake Wilson of The Age also gave 1 out of 5 stars, writing: "This is less an actual movie than a lazy approximation, half-heartedly monkeying with formula while showing no understanding of why that formula ever worked at all."

Chris Columbus, the original director of the first two Home Alone films was also critical of the decision to make a sixth movie, prior to the release of the film. On the topic of movie remakes, he said, "In this version of Hollywood that we live in, everybody is remaking everything, and rebooting everything. I mean, there's a Home Alone reboot coming out... What's the point? The movie exists, let's just live with the movie that existed. There's no point in any of us remaking The Wizard of Oz, there's no point in any of us remaking the classic films. Make something original, because we need more original material."

=== Accolades ===
Mikey Day and Streeter Seidell were among the screenwriters honored during the Mill Valley Film Festival for their contribution to the film.

== Future ==
In December 2024, during a Q&A event, when original films star Macaulay Culkin was asked if he would ever appear in another Home Alone sequel, he stated that he would need to get a good script, but joked that there was no way any potential script could be worse than the one for this film.
