= Archie Yates =

British actor (born 2009)

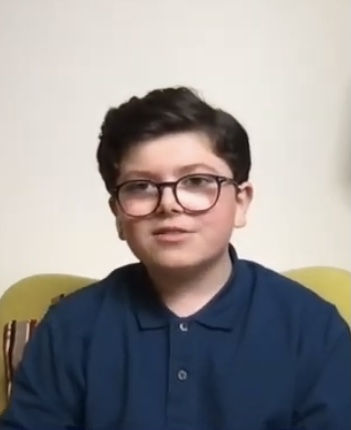
- Archie Yates in 2021
- Born: Archie James Yates; 22 February 2009 (age 17); Kent, England
- Occupation: Actor
- Years active: 2019–present

Archie James Yates (born 22 February 2009) is a British teen actor. He is known for playing Yorki in Jojo Rabbit (2019) and Max Mercer in Home Sweet Home Alone (2021).

== Career ==
Yates made his acting debut in the 2019 film Jojo Rabbit, in which he plays Yorki, Jojo's best friend. On 10 December 2019, Yates, Ellie Kemper and Rob Delaney were announced as the cast for Home Sweet Home Alone - Disney's sixth instalment in the Home Alone franchise, on its Disney+ streaming service. Yates was cast as main character Max Mercer. He also voiced the character Sprout in Wolfboy and the Everything Factory on Apple TV+.

== Filmography ==
Film work by Archie Yates
Year	Title	Role	Notes
2019	Jojo Rabbit	Yorki	Film debut
2021	Home Sweet Home Alone	Max Mercer	

Television work by Archie Yates
Year	Title	Role	Notes
2021	Wolfboy and the Everything Factory	Sprout	Voice; Main role
2022	Amphibia	Jojo Potato	Voice; Episode: "Newts in Tights"
2022	Oni: Thunder God's Tale	Kappa	Voice

== Award and nomination ==
Accolades for Archie Yates
Year	Nominated work	Award	Category	Result
2020	Jojo Rabbit	Critics' Choice Movie Awards	Best Young Actor/Actress	Nominated
