= Katie Beth Hall =

American actor

Katie Beth Hall (born January 26, 2005) is an American actress who has appeared in television, film, and stage roles. She began her career as a child actor on stage in 2016 and appeared the following year in the TV series Happy! She portrayed young Kim Wexler in two episodes of Better Call Saul and, in 2021, played Sarah Maris in the HBO reboot of Head of the Class.

== Career ==
Hall began her professional acting career in the theater in 2016, when she played the role of Cathy Krohl in The Hard Problem at the Studio Center in Washington, D.C. At age 13 in 2018, she reprised the role off-Broadway at the Mitzi Newhouse Theater in Lincoln Center, New York City.

In 2017 and 2018, Hall played the role of Brooke in six episodes of the series Happy!, played Emma in the season 2 finale of Bull, and had other small roles in films and television shows. In 2020 and 2022, respectively, she was featured in two episodes of Better Call Saul, playing young Kim Wexler during extended flashbacks in season 5 and 6. Of her performance in the episode "Wexler v. Goodman", Shawn Laib wrote in Den of Geek that Hall "capture[d] all of the intricacies of the character's mannerisms, making the flashback feel even more real and riveting." Chris Evangelista of SlashFilm noted that Hall "really nail[ed] down Rhea Seehorn's mannerisms" in the episode "Axe and Grind". Jeff Ames of ComingSoon.net wrote of the same scene: "A whole slew of emotions splashes across [young Kim's] face – astonishment, surprise, shock, anger, amusement. ... The acting in this opening scene is phenomenal by all involved. In The Boston Globe, Don Aucoin praised Hall as one of several young actors who have risen to the "tricky challenge" of creating a younger version of a main character, including capturing their "mannerisms, vocal inflections and general demeanor", in Hall's case, the "controlled composure of the adult Kim".

In 2021, Hall played Sarah Maris in the HBO reboot of the 1980s sitcom, Head of the Class. Of her casting in Head of the Class, Syed Fahadullah wrote, "Hall has demonstrated her acting prowess in shows like Happy! and Bull". Daniel Fienberg, reviewing the first three episodes in The Hollywood Reporter, states that "Escalona and the expertly snarky Hall ... can sell any punchline". In a review of episode 6 ("All We Do Is Win") for Bleeding Cool, Tom Chang wrote that Hall "gains a more significant presence with each episode", and that she had "some of the best one-liners". The same year, Hall appeared in the film Home Sweet Home Alone as Abby McKenzie.
