= JMM (Better Call Saul) =

- Better Call Saul episode
- Promotional poster
- Episode no.: Season 5 Episode 7
- Directed by: Melissa Bernstein
- Written by: Alison Tatlock
- Cinematography by: Marshall Adams
- Editing by: Chris McCaleb
- Original air date: March 30, 2020
- Running time: 47 minutes

Guest appearances
- Laura Fraser as Lydia Rodarte-Quayle; Kerry Condon as Stacey Ehrmantraut; Lavell Crawford as Huell Babineaux; Dennis Boutsikaris as Rich Schweikart; Rex Linn as Kevin Wachtell; Cara Pifko as Paige Novick; Nigel Gibbs as Tim Roberts; Norbert Weisser as Peter Schuler; Saidah Arrika Ekulona as ADA Gina Khalil; Dan Martin as Judge Xavier Parson; Jim Hoffmaster as Judge Gerard Velber; Juliet Donenfeld as Kaylee Ehrmantraut

Episode chronology
← Previous "Wexler v. Goodman"	Next → "Bagman"
- Better Call Saul season 5

"JMM" is the seventh episode of the fifth season of the AMC television series Better Call Saul, a spin-off series of Breaking Bad. The episode aired on March 30, 2020, on AMC in the United States. Outside of the United States, the episode premiered on the streaming service Netflix in several countries.

== Plot ==
Jimmy McGill and Kim Wexler get married in a civil ceremony; with spousal privilege, Jimmy can tell Kim about his cases without fear of legal consequences.

Under the alias Jorge de Guzmán, Lalo Salamanca is charged with Fred Whalen's murder. (Note: As seen in "Winner.") Nacho Varga calls Jimmy to represent Lalo at arraignment. Lalo is remanded and directs Jimmy to obtain his release on bail, promising that if successful, Jimmy will become a "friend of the cartel". Jimmy tests his new relationship with Kim by telling her about Lalo.

Rich Schweikart and Kim apologize to Kevin Wachtell for the outcome of Everett Acker's case, (Note: As seen in "Wexler v. Goodman.") and Kevin indicates he may decide not to retain them. They leave, but Kim leads Rich back to Kevin's office and tells him he consistently ignored their advice and that whether he retains them or obtains new lawyers, he should be more willing to listen. Kevin indicates his approval by telling them he will see them at their regular Thursday meeting.

At night, Mike Ehrmantraut reads The Little Prince to Kaylee and later tells Stacey he is past the problem that caused his recent anger. (Note: As seen in "Namaste.") Nacho tells Mike that Lalo wants Nacho to burn down one of Gus Fring's restaurants. In Houston, Gus and other Madrigal subsidiary owners report to CEO Peter Schuler. Gus later meets with Peter and Lydia Rodarte-Quayle to update them on the meth lab's construction and warns them that Lalo remains a threat. Peter panics and Gus calms him by reminding him of an experience they shared in Santiago. Gus and Nacho later protect Nacho's role as the mole inside the Salamanca organization by destroying the Los Pollos Hermanos in Los Lunas.

Gus wants Lalo released, so Mike provides Jimmy details about the investigation he did under an assumed name. Jimmy uses the information at the bail hearing to accuse police of witness tampering. The judge grants bail of $7 million cash, which Lalo says he can pay. Howard Hamlin approaches Jimmy again about working at HHM and Jimmy says he is still considering it. Howard realizes Jimmy is toying with him, including damaging his car and disrupting his recent business lunch with Clifford Main, so he rescinds the offer. Jimmy continues to blame Howard for Chuck McGill's death (Note: As seen in "Smoke.") and proclaims that as Saul Goodman, he has grown too big for the constraints of a job at HHM.

== Production ==
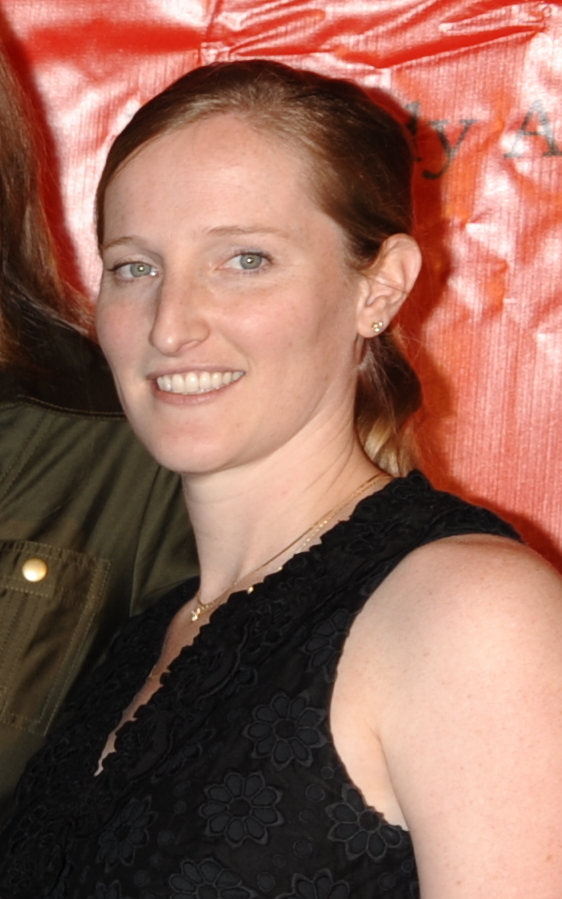
"JMM" marks the directorial debut of Melissa Bernstein

"JMM" is the directorial debut of Melissa Bernstein, an executive producer on Breaking Bad, Better Call Saul, and El Camino.

Several Easter eggs referencing Breaking Bad were included in this episode. Bernstein created a bookend scene for the character Peter Schuler, the CEO of Madrigal, to contrast with his death scene in the Breaking Bad episode "Madrigal", with both scenes starting with Peter tasting sauces from Madrigal's restaurant subsidiaries. They also brought in the use of the phrase "friend of the cartel" which Saul utters in desperation to Walt and Jesse when they abduct him in his introductory Breaking Bad episode "Better Call Saul," believing that Lalo provided a good way to introduce that phrase to Jimmy/Saul. Other such references include the allusion to Jimmy's previous two marriages prior to Kim, and Lydia's trademark red-soled high heel shoes.

Alan Sepinwall for Rolling Stone and Melanie McFarland for Salon both observed that the episode's title, "JMM," could be taken three ways: as Jimmy's own initials (James Morgan McGill), as an initialism for "Justice Matters Most" (which Jimmy coins because Kim gave him the monogrammed briefcase after he decided to use the Saul Goodman name), and as an initialism for the phrase "Just Make Money" (the phrase Lalo uses to persuade Jimmy to obtain his release on bail).

== Reception ==
"JMM" received acclaim from critics. On Rotten Tomatoes, it holds a 100% rating, with an average 9.08 out of 10 review score from 14 reviews. Its summary of the critical consensus is "Jimmy ties the knot, but Saul Goodman is hanging a noose over everyone's future in this diabolically satisfying installment."

Emmy nominee Giancarlo Esposito submitted this episode for consideration for the Primetime Emmy Award for Outstanding Supporting Actor in a Drama Series for the 72nd Primetime Emmy Awards.

=== Ratings ===
"JMM" was watched by 1.30 million viewers on its first broadcast.
