= Wexler v. Goodman =

- Better Call Saul episode
- Promotional poster
- Episode no.: Season 5 Episode 6
- Directed by: Michael Morris
- Written by: Thomas Schnauz
- Cinematography by: Marshall Adams
- Editing by: Skip Macdonald
- Original air date: March 23, 2020
- Running time: 51 minutes

Guest appearances
- Ed Begley, Jr. as Clifford Main; Dennis Boutsikaris as Rich Schweikart; Rex Linn as Kevin Wachtell; Cara Pifko as Paige Novick; Josh Fadem as The Camera Guy; Nigel Gibbs as Tim Roberts; Keiko Agena as Viola Goto; Jeremiah Bitsui as Victor; Hayley Holmes as The Make-Up Girl; Beth Hoyt as Mrs. Wexler; Katie Beth Hall as Young Kim Wexler; Geri Courtney-Austein as Sally; Laci Mosley as Honeydew; Lela Lee as Lillian Simmons; Jay Johnston as Don Wachtell

Episode chronology
← Previous "Dedicado a Max"	Next → "JMM"
- Better Call Saul season 5

"Wexler v. Goodman" is the sixth episode of the fifth season of the AMC television series Better Call Saul, a spin-off series of Breaking Bad. The episode aired on March 23, 2020, on AMC in the United States. Outside of the United States, the episode premiered on the streaming service Netflix in several countries. In "Wexler v. Goodman," Kim Wexler and Jimmy McGill's con of Kevin Wachtell and Mesa Verde reaches a boiling point, and Mike Ehrmantraut & Nacho Varga learn that they share a common adversary in Lalo Salamanca.

== Plot ==
=== Opening ===
In a flashback to Kim Wexler's teenage years in Red Cloud, Nebraska, her mother is late picking her up from school because she has been drinking. Kim refuses to ride home with her and walks away. Kim's mother angrily yells that Kim never listens to her.

=== Main story ===
Jimmy McGill's camera crew and local actors film at the nail salon. Kim arrives and tells Jimmy she does not want to blackmail Kevin Wachtell (Note: As depicted in "Dedicado a Max") and offers a settlement to Everett Acker, with Kim personally making up the difference between what Kevin agrees to pay and a $75,000 total; Jimmy reluctantly agrees.

Nacho Varga meets with Gus Fring, Victor, and Mike Ehrmantraut. He reports on Lalo Salamanca's plans to reveal the locations of Gus' street dealers to the police. Gus tells Victor to ensure that only low-level employees are arrested and if necessary, to hire new ones to sacrifice. Gus tells Nacho that from now on, he will report to Mike. After Gus leaves, Nacho warns Mike about Gus' ruthlessness but Mike reminds Nacho that he warned him of the risk he took by trying to kill Hector Salamanca. (Note: As depicted in "Expenses") Mike discreetly feeds police information about Lalo's car and its connection to Fred Whalen's murder (Note: As depicted in "Winner") before using a tip from Nacho to have police converge on Lalo's location and detain him.

After representing two prostitutes in court, Jimmy pays them to embarrass Howard Hamlin at his business lunch with Clifford Main. Jimmy later meets with Kim, Rich Schweikart, Kevin Wachtell, and Paige Novick to complete Acker's settlement and stuns everyone by demanding $4 million. When Kevin ridicules him, Jimmy shows his video: rough cuts of commercials seeking plaintiffs for class-action lawsuits against Mesa Verde, which unfavorably depict Kevin's father, Don Wachtell. Kim's insight from Sobchak's photos of Kevin's house is that Mesa Verde's logo is based on a photograph the bank did not obtain permission to use. Jimmy uses the threat of lawsuits and an injunction against displaying the logo to persuade Kevin to accept a settlement that includes cash for Acker and the photographer and letting Acker keep his house.

When Kim comes home, Jimmy is apprehensive but says Kim and he should celebrate. Kim vents her anger at Jimmy for making her the "sucker" in his con. She says they either need to end their relationship, or get married.

== Production ==
The name of the Native American photographer referenced in the episode, Olivia Bitsui, is a reference to the daughter of actor Jeremiah Bitsui, who plays Victor. When Kim arrives home, Jimmy is playing the guitar riff from the Deep Purple song "Smoke on the Water." This is the same song Jimmy's con artist partner Marco was humming when he died, and the same one Jimmy was humming when he left the courthouse parking lot after initially turning down the job offer with Davis & Main. (Note: from "Marco") The guitar he plays is the white Fender Stratocaster he acquired from the music store owners when he staged a slip and fall accident after they refused to pay for the commercial he produced for them, another occasion when he played "Smoke on the Water." (Note: from "Slip")

== Reception ==
"Wexler v. Goodman" was acclaimed by critics. On Rotten Tomatoes, it received a perfect 100% approval from 13 reviews with an average 9/10 review rating, with a summary "Like a cookie full of arsenic, 'Wexler V. Goodman' delivers the fun and the toxic, enthralling viewers with Jimmy's plan before delivering a series of gut punches they aren't soon to forget."

=== Ratings ===
"Wexler v. Goodman" was watched by 1.40 million viewers on its first broadcast, which was a slight decrease from the previous week of 1.45 million.
