= Fall (Better Call Saul) =

- Better Call Saul episode
- Episode no.: Season 3 Episode 9
- Directed by: Minkie Spiro
- Written by: Gordon Smith
- Editing by: Skip Macdonald
- Original air date: June 12, 2017
- Running time: 49 minutes

Guest appearances
- Laura Fraser as Lydia Rodarte-Quayle; Chris Mulkey as Billy Gatwood; Bonnie Bartlett as Helen; Jean Effron as Irene Landry; Tina Parker as Francesca Liddy; Jeremiah Bitsui as Victor; Juan Carlos Cantu as Manuel Varga; Phyllis Applegate as Myrtle; Carol Mansell as Rose; Vincent Fuentes as Arturo Colon; Mark Margolis as Hector Salamanca

Episode chronology
← Previous "Slip"	Next → "Lantern"
- Better Call Saul season 3

"Fall" is the ninth and penultimate episode of the third season of the AMC television series Better Call Saul, the spinoff series of Breaking Bad. The episode aired on June 12, 2017 on AMC in the United States. Outside of the United States, the episode premiered on streaming service Netflix in several countries.

== Plot ==
Jimmy McGill discovers from Irene Landry, his former elder law client who represents the class in the Sandpiper Crossing lawsuit, (Note: As seen in "RICO".) that the company has offered a settlement. Irene has refused because the lawyers have advised her they believe they can get Sandpiper to offer more. Jimmy stands to receive $1.16 million, and tries to persuade Howard Hamlin to accept, but Howard refuses.

Mike Ehrmantraut becomes a contracted security expert for Madrigal, a paper transaction designed to launder his stolen money (Note: As seen in "Slip".) by having him give his cash to Lydia Rodarte-Quayle and then receive monthly consulting fees. Kim Wexler takes on Gatwood Oil as a second client to cover office expenses in case Jimmy is unable to pay his half while his law license is suspended. (Note: As seen in "Off Brand".)

During a meeting with Gus Fring, Hector Salamanca is driven into a rage by the news that Don Eladio wishes to continue to use the Los Pollos Hermanos logistics network to smuggle drugs into the United States. Hector experiences angina, but endures it after taking his nitroglycerin, despite Nacho Varga switching it for ibuprofen. Nacho admits to his father Manuel that he is working for Hector Salamanca and begs him to follow Hector's order to use the upholstery shop as a front for Hector's drug trade in order to keep competing with Gus. Manuel refuses and orders Nacho to leave his house.

Howard and Chuck McGill meet with their malpractice insurance agents. Based on the information provided by Jimmy, (Note: As seen in "Expenses".) the agents inform them that because of Chuck's mental condition he will need to be supervised by another attorney at all times or HHM will face a substantial premium increase. Chuck wants to fight the insurance company, but Howard disagrees and says he will force Chuck to retire since his judgment can no longer be trusted. Chuck promptly sues HHM for $8 million, the value of his share of the partnership.

Jimmy pulls a series of psychological and social manipulation tricks to turn Irene's friends against her so that she believes refusing the Sandpiper settlement is against the interests of her fellow clients. She decides to accept, meaning Jimmy will receive his much-needed share. He returns to his office to give Kim the good news, but she is too busy preparing for an important meeting with Gatwood Oil to listen and leaves in a rush. Due to fatigue from overwork, Kim falls asleep at the wheel and crashes into a boulder.

== Reception ==
=== Ratings ===
Upon airing, the episode received 1.47 million American viewers, and an 18–49 rating of 0.5.

=== Critical reception ===
The episode received critical acclaim. It holds a 100% rating on Rotten Tomatoes based on 12 reviews with an average score 8.71/10, stating "Fall" brings weeks' worth of tension to a head with a pivotal episode that powerfully sets up the season finale while hinting at the series' future direction." Terri Schwartz of IGN gave a 9.0 rating, saying "With everything falling apart in the penultimate episode of Season 3, Better Call Saul delivered an excellent episode in "Fall.""
