= Sabrosito =

- Better Call Saul episode
- Episode no.: Season 3 Episode 4
- Directed by: Thomas Schnauz
- Written by: Jonathan Glatzer
- Original air date: May 1, 2017
- Running time: 47 minutes

Guest appearances
- Steven Bauer as Don Eladio Vuente; Javier Grajeda as Juan Bolsa; Kerry Condon as Stacey Ehrmantraut; Manuel Uriza as Ximenez Lecerda; Kimberly Hébert Gregory as DDA Kyra Hay; Harrison Thomas as Lyle; Tina Parker as Francesca Liddy; Jeremiah Bitsui as Victor; Vincent Fuentes as Arturo Colon; Abigail Zoe Lewis as Kaylee Ehrmantraut; Mark Margolis as Hector Salamanca

Episode chronology
← Previous "Sunk Costs"	Next → "Chicanery"
- Better Call Saul season 3

"Sabrosito" is the fourth episode of the third season of the AMC television series Better Call Saul, the spinoff series of Breaking Bad. The episode aired on May 1, 2017, on AMC in the United States. Outside of the United States, the episode premiered on streaming service Netflix in several countries.

== Plot ==
=== Opening ===
In a flashback to 1999, Hector Salamanca introduces Ximenez Lecerda (Note: The truck driver Mike Ehrmantraut later robs as seen in "Nailed" and Hector has killed as seen in "Klick".) to Don Eladio. Hector says he has purchased an Albuquerque ice cream store that will facilitate drug sales because Ximenez can bring cocaine over the border when he delivers store supplies. Hector has named the store for Eladio: "El Griego Guiñador". (Note: "The Winking Greek"; Eladio is a Spanish name which means "The Greek".) He also presents the gift of a bobblehead mascot for the store which is named "Sabrosito", as well as a cash tribute. Juan Bolsa arrives with Gus Fring's gifts — a Los Pollos Hermanos T-shirt and a larger cash tribute. Eladio teases Hector and Hector is humiliated, but Juan reminds him to show respect to their boss.

=== Main story ===
Mike Ehrmantraut surveils Hector's ice cream store and observes police arriving. He later visits Stacey and Kaylee at their new house. Hector, Nacho Varga, and Arturo visit Los Pollos Hermanos and intimidate the staff while waiting for Gus. When Gus arrives, Hector demands that Gus begin transporting Hector's drugs in Gus' trucks, unaware Gus desires this outcome.

The next day, Gus apologizes to his staff and tells them the men who intimidated them previously extorted money from him in Mexico, but that he refused their new demands. He announces he will pay the staff overtime, in addition to trauma counseling if anyone requests it. Gus' apology and claim to be acting honorably win his staff over.

Kim Wexler cancels the appointment Chuck McGill made to have his home's door repaired (Note: As seen in "Witness".) and Jimmy McGill hires Mike to do it. Mike clandestinely photographs the interior of Chuck's house to document his bizarre living conditions and copies some information from Chuck's desktop. When he hands over the photos, he gives Jimmy the note he made.

Gus visits Mike to ask why he did not accept the money that Victor tried to give him for disrupting Hector's trucks. Mike explains that he attacked them for himself, not Gus, so he does not expect payment. (Note: As seen in "Sunk Costs".) Gus says he is interested in hiring Mike, and Mike says he might be amenable.

Jimmy, Kim, Howard Hamlin, Chuck, and ADA Hay meet to finalize Jimmy's confession. Afterward, Kim tells Chuck she suspects he has another copy of the tape. Chuck confirms that he plans to submit the original at Jimmy's bar association hearing. Kim informs Jimmy and reveals that having Chuck admit the existence of the second tape is part of her plan to defend him.

== Production ==
The title is derived from the Spanish word "Sabroso" which means "delicious" or "tasty". In the cold open, Gus' homosexuality is hinted at when Hector says a better name for "Los Pollos Hermanos" ("The Chicken Brothers") might be "Los Culos Hermanos" ("The Butt Brothers").

== Reception ==
=== Ratings ===
Upon airing, the episode received 1.56 million American viewers, and an 18-49 rating of 0.6.

=== Critical reception ===
The episode received critical acclaim, on Rotten Tomatoes, the episode holds a 100% rating with an average score of 8.64/10, based on 15 reviews. The site's consensus reads, '"Sabrosito" juggles narrative strands while advancing Better Call Saul's overall narrative arc—and setting up moments Breaking Bad fans have waited patiently for.'

Terri Schwartz of IGN gave the episode an 8.5 rating, writing "Gus Fring is not a man you want to trifle with, as we discover in the latest episode of Better Call Saul."
