= Better Call Saul season 3 =

Third season of the AMC crime drama television series

Better Call Saul
- Season 3
- Home media cover art
- Showrunners: Vince Gilligan; Peter Gould
- Starring: Bob Odenkirk; Jonathan Banks; Rhea Seehorn; Patrick Fabian; Michael Mando; Michael McKean; Giancarlo Esposito
- No. of episodes: 10

Release
- Original network: AMC
- Original release: April 10 – June 19, 2017

Season chronology
- ← Previous; Season 2 Next → Season 4

The third season of the American television drama series Better Call Saul premiered on April 10, 2017, and concluded on June 19, 2017. The ten-episode season was broadcast on Monday nights in the United States on AMC. A spin-off of Breaking Bad, Better Call Saul was created by Vince Gilligan and Peter Gould, both of whom also worked on Breaking Bad.

The third season immediately follows the events of the second season, which take place in late 2002. The year is 2003 by the third season's conclusion. Bob Odenkirk reprises his role as Jimmy McGill, a lawyer who is engaged in a feud with his brother Chuck (Michael McKean), an attorney who believes Jimmy is unfit to be a lawyer and plots to have him disbarred. Jonathan Banks also reprises his role as Mike Ehrmantraut, who begins a partnership with Gustavo Fring (Giancarlo Esposito), while Nacho Varga (Michael Mando) is plotting to murder their rival, Hector Salamanca (Mark Margolis).

The third season of Better Call Saul received acclaim from critics, particularly for McKean's performance as Chuck, and the character development of Jimmy McGill, and eight nominations for the 69th Primetime Emmy Awards, including Outstanding Drama Series.

== Production ==
=== Development ===
In March 2016, AMC announced that Better Call Saul was renewed for a 10-episode third season which premiered April 10, 2017.

Early in the writing stages, series co-creator and co-showrunner Vince Gilligan left the writers room to focus on new projects. This resulted in Peter Gould, who also created and developed the show, becoming the sole showrunner, a transition that had been planned since the series' beginning.

=== Casting ===
The third season of Better Call Saul features the return of several of the original cast from Breaking Bad, most notably Giancarlo Esposito (Gus Fring), who returned in the second episode "Witness". In a Q&A with AMC, Esposito expressed excitement on his return into the Breaking Bad universe, saying,

"I'm extremely excited. I'm over the moon. I love this family of filmmakers a great deal. I know Better Call Saul is a little bit of a different show than Breaking Bad was and I love the success it's had. It has such wonderful talent in the show. Bob Odenkirk is just stellar. Obviously the opportunity to tell some of the backstory of Gus and how he rose to power and how he came to be is always something I've wanted to explore in a very subtle way in the right venue." He also distinguished Better Call Saul's version of Gus from Breaking Bad's version, describing his character as "a little fresher, a little less jaded. The time period alone takes us to a time where his look may be little bit different. I wanted him to be little more hopeful, a little more energetic, maybe not as definitive in some of his actions because he's a Gus that we've never met before."

All of the main cast members returned for this season. Bob Odenkirk returns as Jimmy McGill, Jonathan Banks returns as Mike Ehrmantraut, Rhea Seehorn returns as Kim Wexler, Patrick Fabian returns as Howard Hamlin, Michael Mando returns as Nacho Varga, and Michael McKean returns as Chuck McGill, Jimmy's elder brother. This was the first season of Better Call Saul to feature Giancarlo Esposito as a member of the main cast.

=== Filming ===
Better Call Saul is set and filmed in Albuquerque, New Mexico, the same location as its predecessor.

In the first scene from the first episode, Jimmy is hiding his real identity under his Gene Takavic alias while working at a Cinnabon in a shopping mall in Omaha, Nebraska. The Cinnabon scenes in Better Call Saul are set in Omaha, but filmed at the Cottonwood Mall in Albuquerque, New Mexico.

== Cast and characters ==
=== Main ===
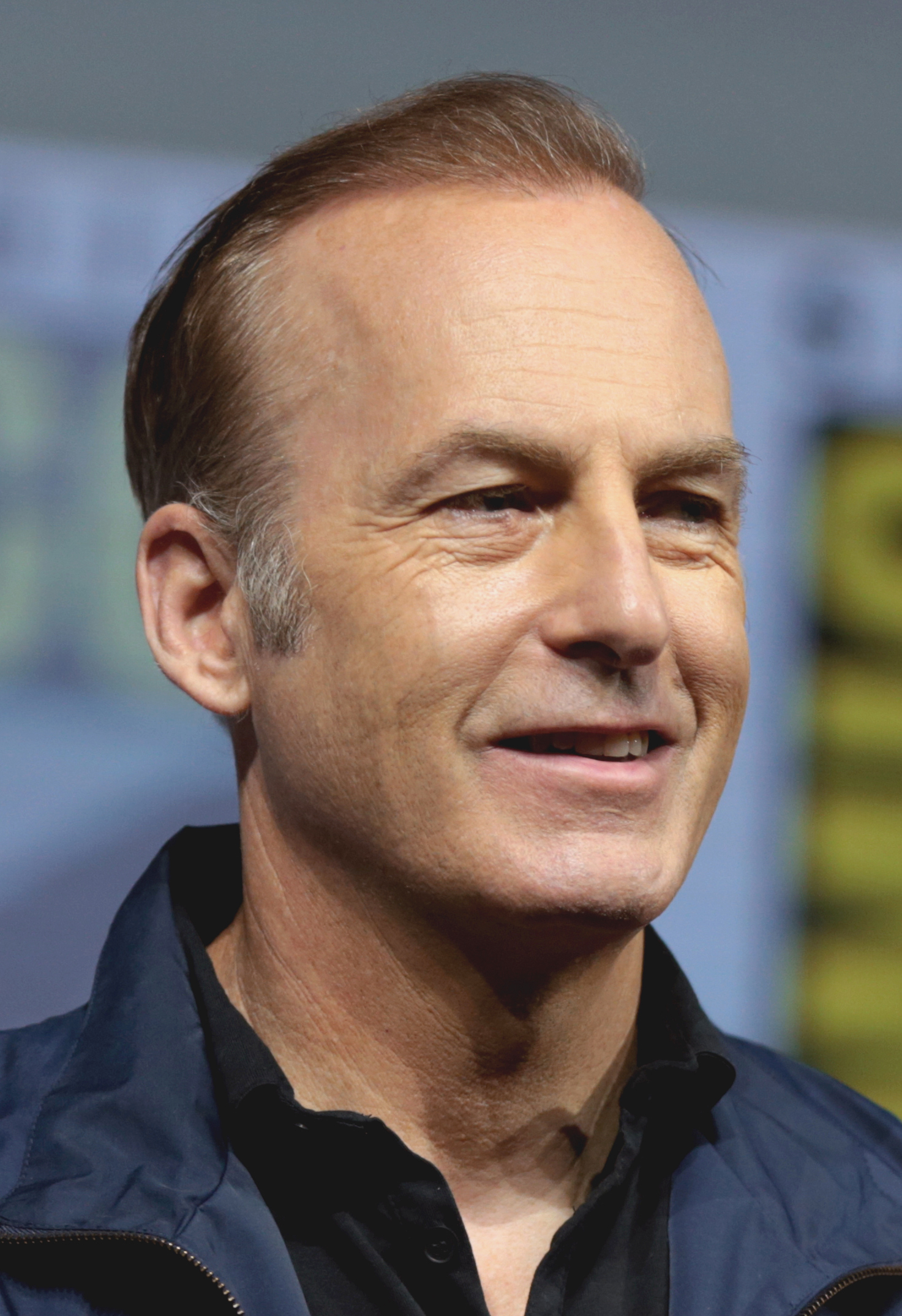
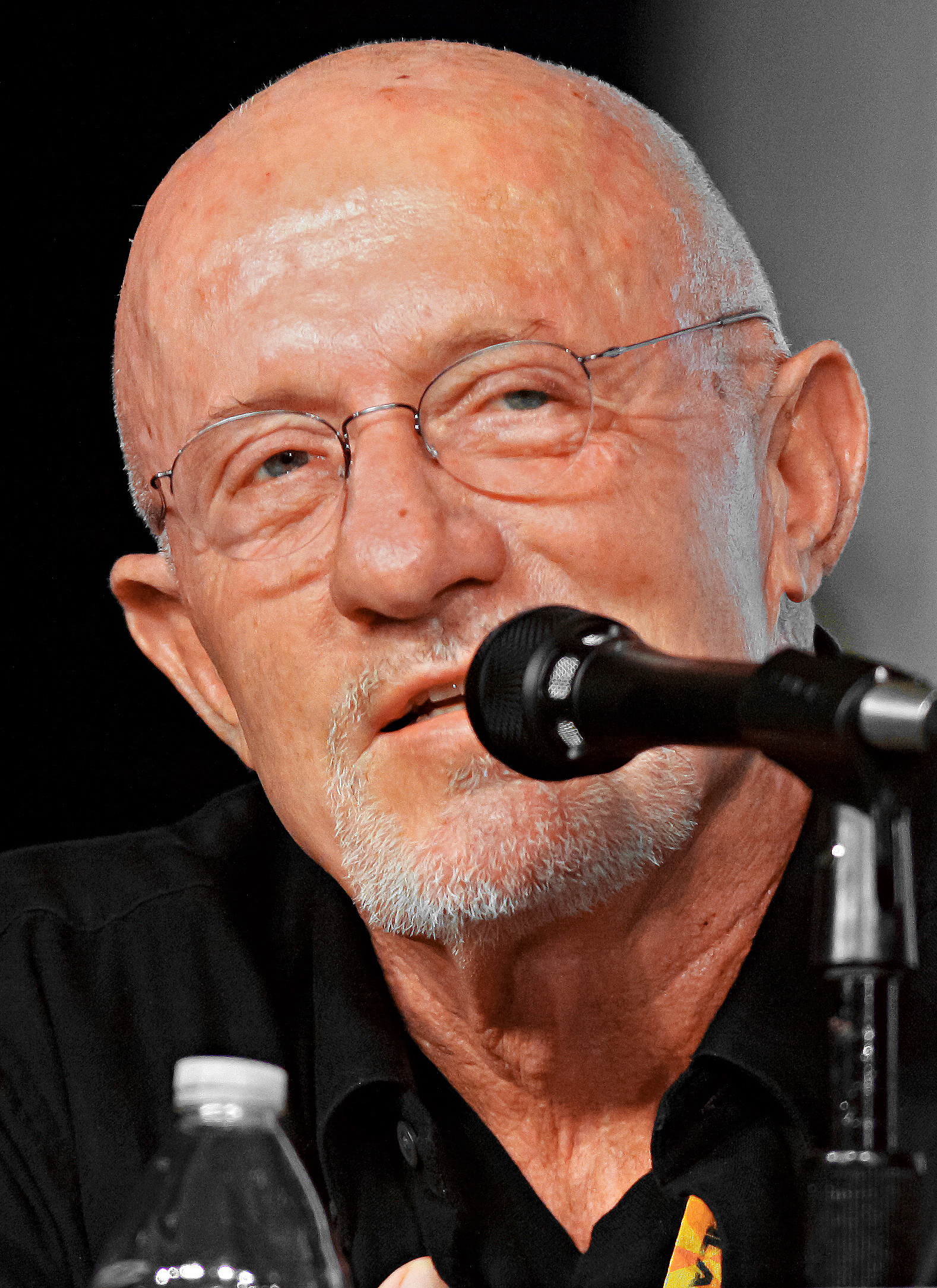
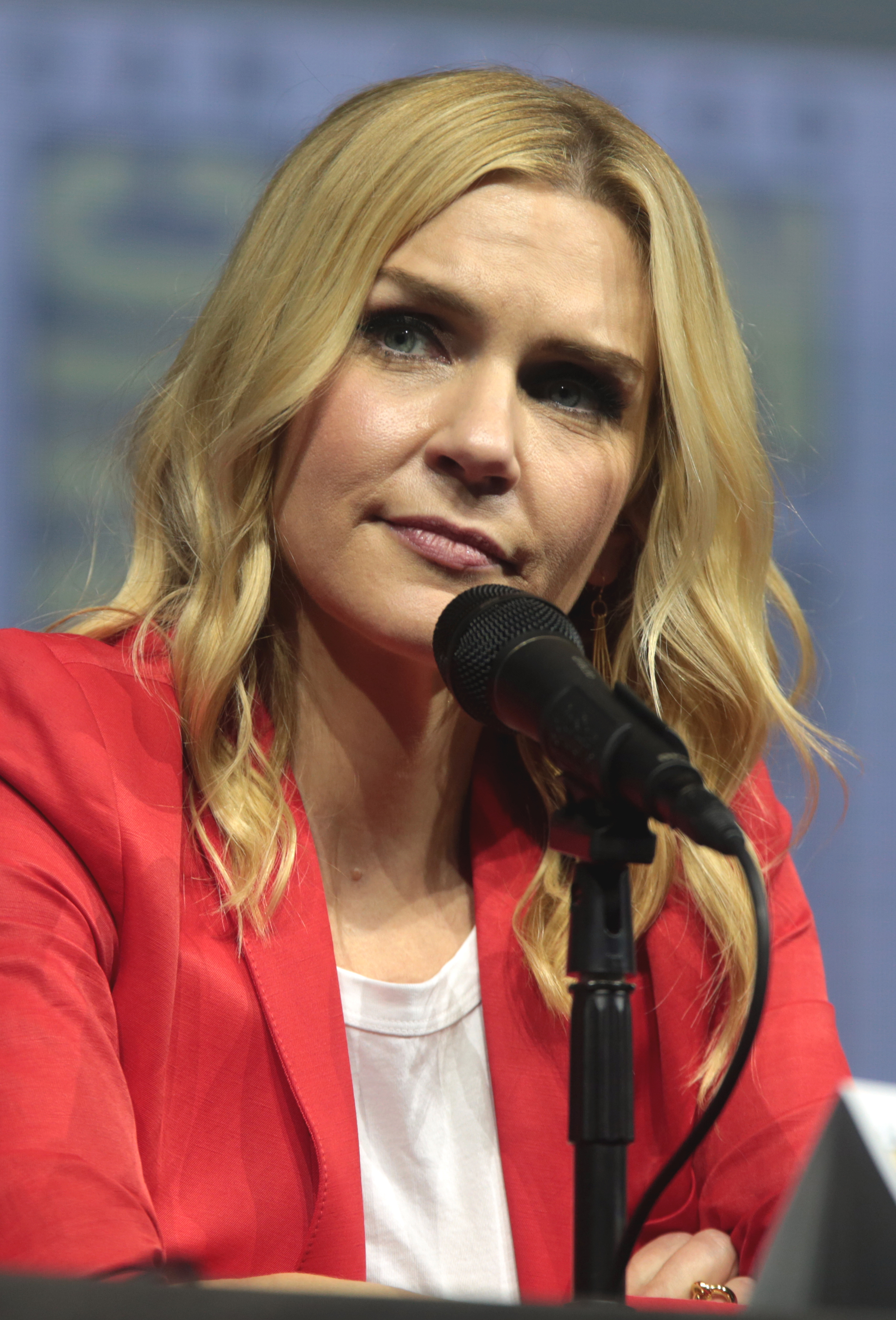
Bob Odenkirk (Jimmy McGill / Saul Goodman), Jonathan Banks (Mike Ehrmantraut), and Rhea Seehorn (Kim Wexler)
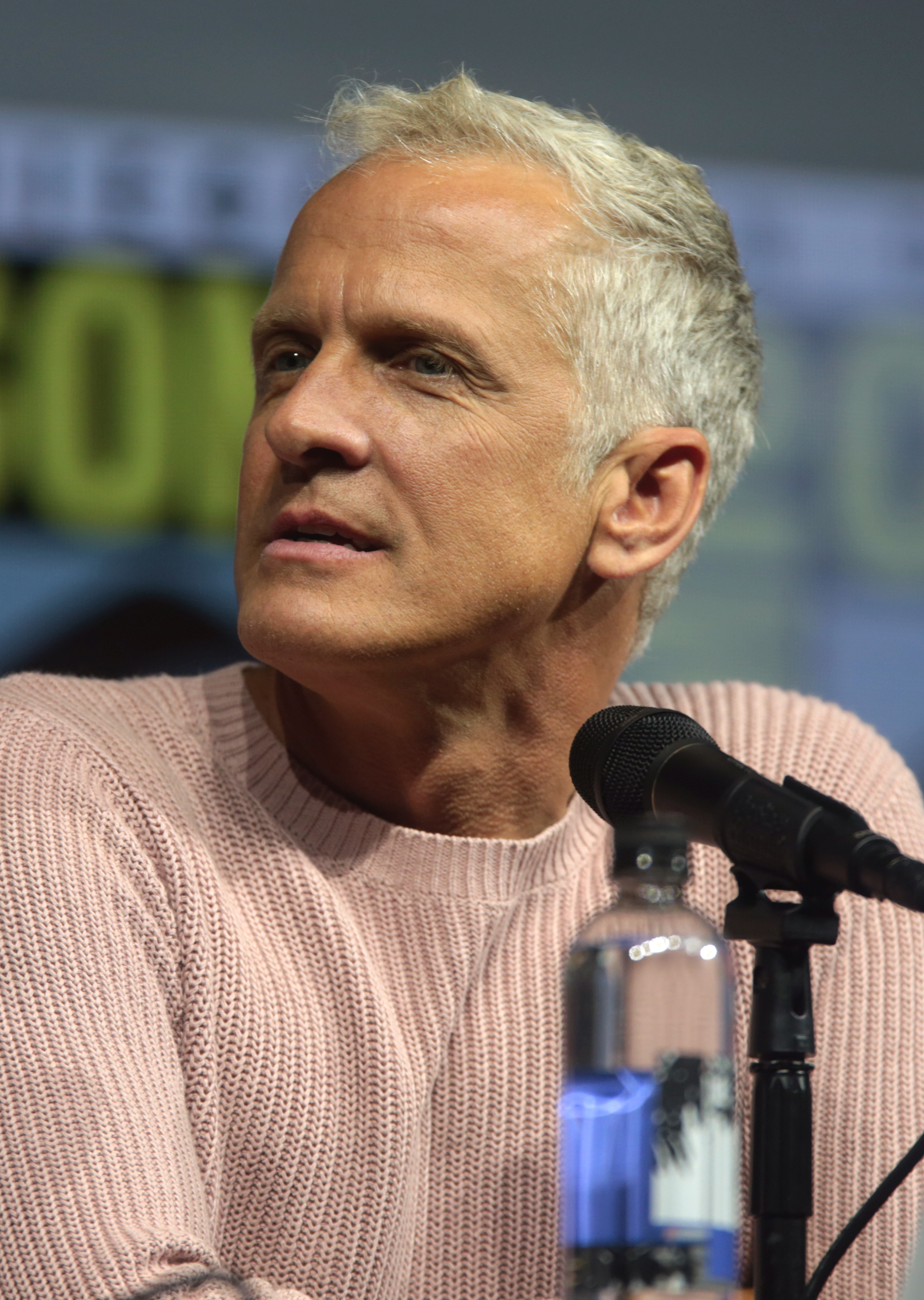
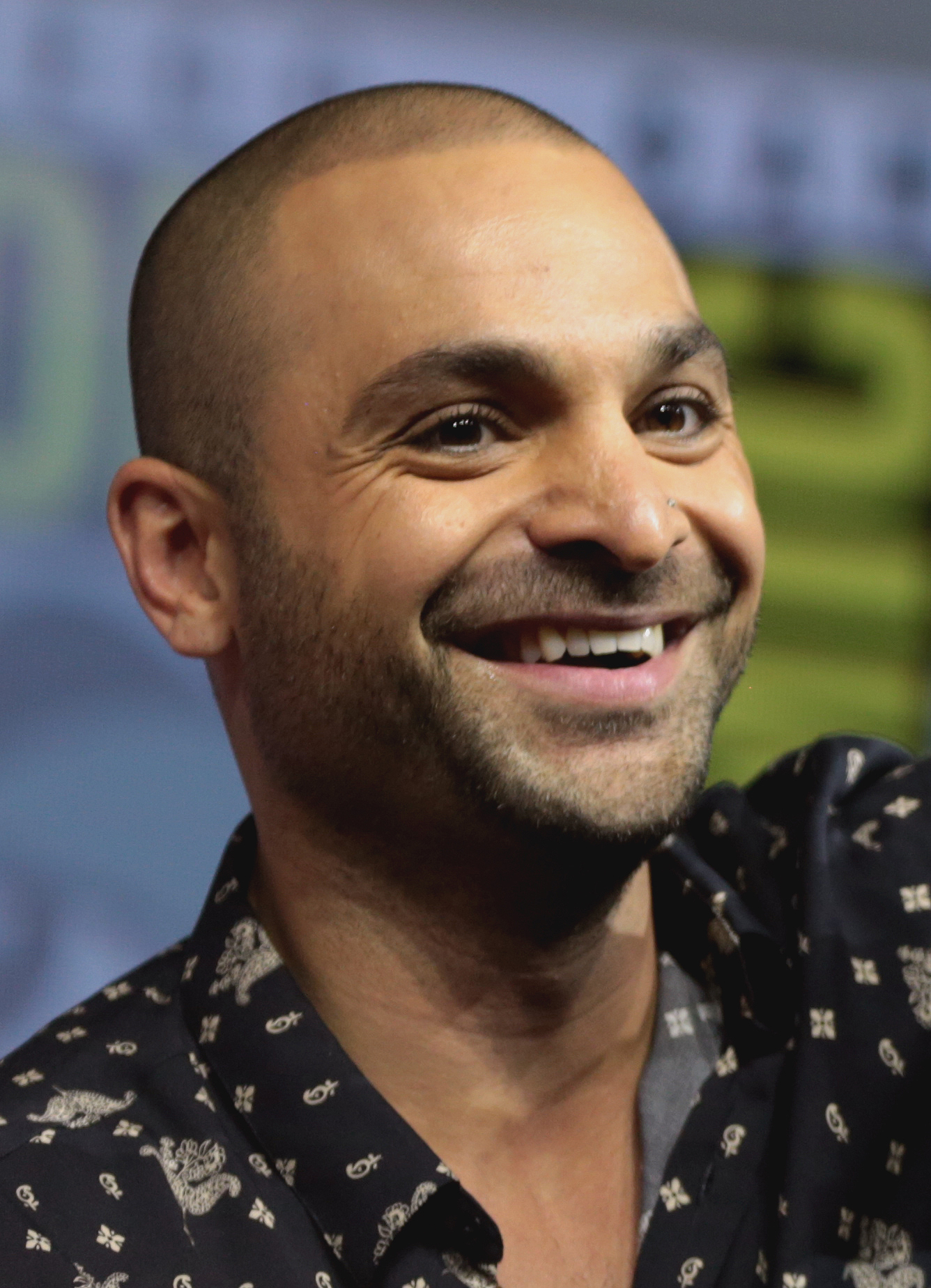
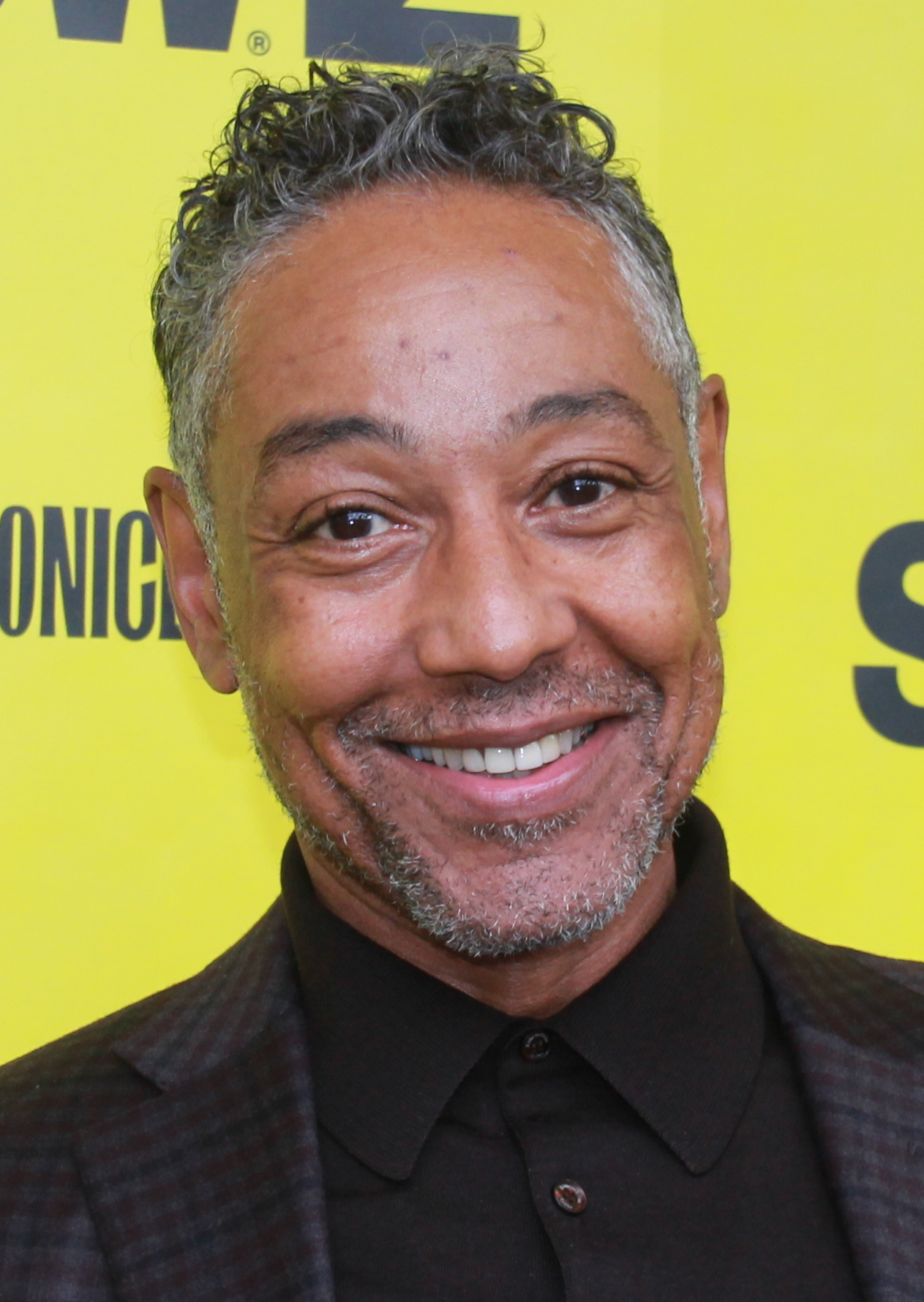
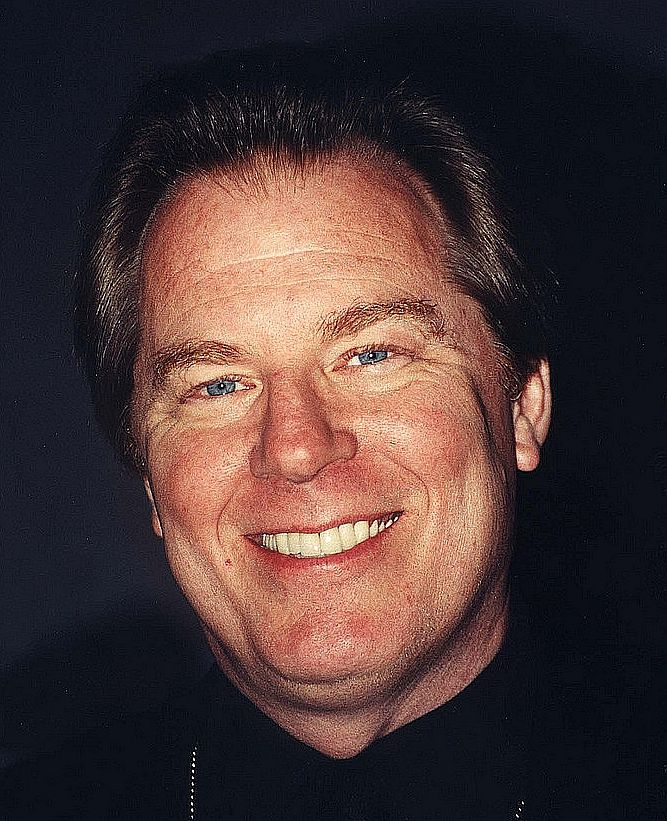
Patrick Fabian (Howard Hamlin), Michael Mando (Nacho Varga), Michael McKean (Chuck McGill), and Giancarlo Esposito (Gus Fring)
- Bob Odenkirk as Jimmy McGill, a lawyer who is involved in a feud with his brother Chuck. In the present, he manages a Cinnabon store in Omaha under the alias Gene Takavic.
- Jonathan Banks as Mike Ehrmantraut, a former Philadelphia police officer, who is engaged in a feud with the Salamancas after they threatened his family.
- Rhea Seehorn as Kim Wexler, a lawyer and Jimmy's close friend and lover, who also co-founds a law firm with him.
- Patrick Fabian as Howard Hamlin, Chuck's law partner at Hamlin, Hamlin & McGill (HHM) and Jimmy's arch rival.
- Michael Mando as Nacho Varga, a member of the Salamanca drug ring, who secretly works with Mike in taking down Hector.
- Giancarlo Esposito as Gus Fring, a methamphetamine distributor who uses his fast food restaurant chain Los Pollos Hermanos as a front.
- Michael McKean as Chuck McGill, Jimmy's elder brother, who allegedly suffers from electromagnetic hypersensitivity, compelling him to avoid sources of electricity.

=== Recurring ===
- Mark Margolis as Hector Salamanca, Tuco's uncle and the leader of the Salamanca drug ring.
- Jeremiah Bitsui as Victor, Gus's henchman, reprising his role from Breaking Bad.
- Kerry Condon as Stacey Ehrmantraut, Mike's widowed daughter-in-law and the mother of Kaylee Ehrmantraut.
- Tina Parker as Francesca Liddy, Saul's secretary, reprising her role from Breaking Bad.
- Vincent Fuentes as Arturo, a criminal associate of Hector Salamanca.
- Rex Linn as Kevin Wachtell, chairman of Mesa Verde Bank and Trust and a client of HHM and Kim.
- Cara Pifko as Paige Novick, senior legal counsel for Mesa Verde Bank and Trust and a friend of Kim.
- Ann Cusack as Rebecca Bois, Chuck's ex-wife.
- Tamara Tunie as Anita, a support group member.
- Josh Fadem as Camera Guy, a film student who helps Jimmy on various projects.
- Hayley Holmes as Drama Girl, a film student who helps Jimmy on various projects.
- Julian Bonfiglio as Sound Guy, a film student who helps Jimmy on various projects.
- Brandon K. Hampton as Ernesto, Chuck's assistant who works at HHM.
- Jean Effron as Irene, an elderly client of Jimmy McGill overcharged by Sandpiper Crossing.
- Joe DeRosa as Dr. Caldera, a veterinarian who serves as Mike's liaison to the criminal underworld.
- Juan Carlos Cantu as Manuel Varga, Nacho's father who is the owner of a car restoration shop.

=== Guest stars ===
- Max Arciniega as Domingo "Krazy-8" Molina, reprising his role from Breaking Bad.
- Ray Campbell as Tyrus, reprising his role from Breaking Bad.
- Manuel Uriza as Ximenez Lecerda, an associate of Hector Salamanca.
- Laura Fraser as Lydia Rodarte-Quayle, reprising her role from Breaking Bad.
- Lavell Crawford as Huell Babineaux, reprising his role from Breaking Bad.
- Steven Bauer as Don Eladio Vuente, reprising his role from Breaking Bad.
- Kimberly Hebert Gregory as Kyra Hay, a deputy district attorney.
- Brendan Fehr as Bauer, a military captain.
- John Getz as chairman, a lawyer and a member of the New Mexico Bar Association.
- Mel Rodriguez as Marco Pasternak, Jimmy's friend from Cicero, Illinois.
- Clea DuVall as Dr. Lara Cruz, Chuck's doctor.
- Javier Grajeda as Juan Bolsa, a high-level member of the Juárez drug cartel that includes the Salamancas and Gus Fring, reprising his role from Breaking Bad.
- Mark Proksch as Daniel "Pryce" Wormald, a seller of pharmaceuticals and small-time drug dealer.
- Jessie Ennis as Erin Brill, an employee at Davis & Main.

== Episodes ==
Better Call Saul season 3 episodes
No. overall	No. in season	Title	Directed by	Written by	Original release date	U.S. viewers (millions)
21	1	"Mabel"	Vince Gilligan	Vince Gilligan & Peter Gould	April 10, 2017	1.81
In a flash-forward, "Gene" points out to mall security guards a shoplifter hiding in a photo booth, but yells at him to stay silent and obtain counsel. He then falls unconscious at work. In 2002, Jimmy helps Chuck remove foil from his walls and reminisces over a children's book they read together, but Chuck promises consequences for the fraud that humiliated him. Chuck plays Jimmy's confession to Howard, who says it has no legal value, but Chuck insists it has a use. Chuck later asks Ernesto to change the player's batteries and Ernesto hears the confession, but Chuck swears him to secrecy. Meanwhile, determined to discover how someone prevented him from killing Hector, Mike dismantles his station wagon and finds a tracking device in the gas cap, finding the same type of device in his sedan. Mike obtains a similar tracker and is able to trick the man following him to pick it up, enabling Mike to follow him.
22	2	"Witness"	Vince Gilligan	Thomas Schnauz	April 17, 2017	1.46
Chuck meets with a private investigator. The individuals who changed tracking devices on Mike's car meet with a courier, whom Mike tails until he stops at Los Pollos Hermanos. Mike asks Jimmy to watch the courier inside the restaurant. Jimmy notices nothing unusual, briefly conversing with the manager, Gus Fring, before leaving and reporting to Mike. Mike proceeds to follow the tracking device, until he finds it with his gas cap and a cell phone in the middle of a remote stretch of road; the phone rings, and Mike answers it. Meanwhile, Ernesto tells Kim he heard Jimmy's taped confession. Kim has Jimmy engage her as counsel to obtain attorney-client privilege and tells him about the tape. She tells Jimmy it is useless in court and wonders what Chuck is planning, so she suggests Jimmy wait for Chuck to make the first move. However, Jimmy angrily breaks in to Chuck's house and destroys the tape. Howard and the private investigator reveal themselves and tell Chuck they witnessed the crimes Jimmy committed, enabling Chuck to report him to the police.
23	3	"Sunk Costs"	John Shiban	Gennifer Hutchison	April 24, 2017	1.52
Mike meets Gus, and they agree that Gus will stop tracking Mike and that Mike will not kill Hector, however Gus supports Mike's attempts to attract police attention to Hector. Mike obtains a small amount of cocaine from Barry Goodman, stuffs it into the toe of a sneaker, and hangs the pair from a cable spanning the road where Hector's drivers stop to stash their guns before crossing the Mexican border. As they depart, Mike shoots the sneakers, causing cocaine to spill onto the truck. When the truck arrives at the border crossing, drug-sniffing dogs are alerted, and Hector's drivers are arrested. Meanwhile, Jimmy is arrested for the break-in at Chuck's, pleads not guilty, and posts bail. The prosecutor informs Chuck that she takes the charges seriously and will press for jail time, but Chuck suggests a better solution than criminal prosecution. Jimmy tells Kim that Chuck's proposal includes Jimmy confessing to the break-in in exchange for probation and a diversion program that could wipe his record clean, but only if he submits his confession to the New Mexico Bar Association, which could result in disbarment. Kim convinces Jimmy to let her help him fight Chuck's plan.
24	4	"Sabrosito"	Thomas Schnauz	Jonathan Glatzer	May 1, 2017	1.56
In a flashback, Hector delivers a cash tribute to Don Eladio, but is humiliated when Gus sends a significantly larger tribute via Juan Bolsa. In 2003, Hector demands Gus use his trucks to smuggle Hector's drugs. Gus seems to reluctantly agree, with Hector not realizing this is part of Gus' plan. Gus sends payment to Mike for his disruption of Hector's trucks, but Mike refuses the money. Jimmy hires Mike to pose as a handyman to repair Chuck's door, which is a ruse allowing Mike to photograph the interior of Chuck's house and document his bizarre living conditions. Gus informs Mike that he is interested in hiring him, and Mike says he is willing to consider it. Jimmy, Kim, Howard, Chuck, and the prosecutor meet to finalize Jimmy's confession, with Jimmy agreeing to have it reviewed by the bar association. Afterward, Kim confronts Chuck and tells him she suspects he has a copy of the tape. Chuck confirms it and states that he plans to submit it as evidence at Jimmy's disciplinary hearing. Kim relays the information to Jimmy and reveals that having Chuck admit the existence of the second tape was part of their strategy for defending Jimmy.
25	5	"Chicanery"	Daniel Sackheim	Gordon Smith	May 8, 2017	1.76
In a flashback, sometime after their divorce, Chuck invites Rebecca to dinner, and works with Jimmy to hide his EHS. Rebecca answers her cell phone during the dinner, and Chuck knocks it out of her hand; he refuses to explain and forbids Jimmy from doing so, so Rebecca angrily departs. In 2003, the bar association hearing occurs, with Kim arguing the situation being a more personal argument between brothers, in particular relating to Chuck's supposed EHS. When Chuck arrives for his testimony, Rebecca appears having been called over by Jimmy, which Chuck believes is a ploy to embarrass him. During Jimmy's cross-examination with Chuck, he questions how close an electronic device has to be before Chuck is affected. Suspecting a trick, Chuck correctly guesses that Jimmy is carrying his cell phone. However, Jimmy then reveals that he had Huell plant his cell phone battery in Chuck's pocket, which Chuck carried for more than an hour without noticing. The bar association's counsel suggests that Chuck's mental illness should not affect the proceedings, and the idea that his illness is not real triggers an outburst from Chuck, who vents all his frustrations about Jimmy. Chuck realizes too late that his tirade has shocked the entire room into silence.
26	6	"Off Brand"	Keith Gordon	Ann Cherkis	May 15, 2017	1.72
Hector compels Nacho to beat Domingo when his weekly payment is short, disillusioning Nacho. The bar association suspends Jimmy for a year but does not disbar him. As Kim and Jimmy celebrate, Rebecca arrives and asks Jimmy to help her see Chuck, who will not answer his door, but Jimmy refuses. Howard visits Chuck and suggests he end the feud with Jimmy and look to the future, and Chuck agrees. Nacho and Arturo pick up cocaine from Gus' warehouse, and Nacho attempts to take six packages instead of the expected five. Tyrus calls Gus, who orders Tyrus to give him the sixth package. At the end of the call, Gus is revealed to be scouting a commercial laundry with Lydia. Hector wants Nacho's father's upholstery shop as a front for a new smuggling route, to which Nacho objects. Hector is informed that Tuco's sentence will be extended following a prison fight, and suffers an angina attack. He drops a nitroglycerin capsule, which Nacho steals. Jimmy attempts to avoid losing money he prepaid for TV commercials by making on air pitches for other businesses under the alias "Saul Goodman".
27	7	"Expenses"	Thomas Schnauz	Thomas Schnauz	May 22, 2017	1.65
Jimmy unsuccessfully tries to sell the TV ad time for which he has already paid. Nacho approaches Daniel (Pryce) with the nitroglycerin capsule he stole and asks Daniel to obtain him empty, unsealed lookalikes. Paige gloats over Chuck's loss and praises Kim's cross-examination, but Kim expresses regret for her actions. Mike helps with construction of the new church playground and receives help from other members of Stacey's support group. Daniel asks Mike to be his bodyguard at his planned meeting with Nacho, but Mike declines. After hearing Anita tell the support group about how her husband mysteriously disappeared while hiking years previously, Mike changes his mind and accompanies Daniel. Nacho tells Mike about his plan to stop Hector by replacing his nitroglycerin with ibuprofen in hopes of inducing a fatal heart attack. Mike advises Nacho that if Hector dies, Nacho should immediately take the placebos from Hector and replace them with the real medication, in order to minimize the chance that Hector's death will be recognized as murder and traced back to Nacho. Jimmy attempts to obtain a malpractice insurance premium refund, then feigns distress over Chuck's health in order to sabotage Chuck's insurance.
28	8	"Slip"	Adam Bernstein	Heather Marion	June 5, 2017	1.63
In a flashback, Jimmy and Marco recover Jimmy's coin collection from the abandoned McGill store in Cicero and find one to use later in a con. Marco fondly reminisces about Jimmy's parents, but Jimmy criticizes his father as a "soft touch". In 2003, Chuck follows Dr. Cruz's advice for overcoming his EHS and becomes able to walk outdoors and shop on his own. Two of Jimmy's advertising clients refuse to pay, so he stages a "slip and fall" accident which nets him enough to pay his half of the rent. While at lunch with Kevin and Paige, Kim encounters Howard and tries to repay her law school loan, but Howard refuses. Jimmy coerces his community service supervisor into giving him credit for hours worked while he rests his injured back and earns $700 from another crew member, a drug dealer, by persuading the supervisor to allow him to leave early. Nacho switches Hector's capsules with ibuprofen lookalikes. Mike locates the body of the Good Samaritan that Hector killed and reports it to the police. Gus agrees to help Mike launder the remaining $200,000 of the $250,000 he stole from Hector.
29	9	"Fall"	Minkie Spiro	Gordon Smith	June 12, 2017	1.47
Jimmy receives an update on the Sandpiper case from Irene, the class representative, and finds that HHM and D&M have rejected a substantial settlement. He asks Howard why they will not accept, and Howard says they believe they can obtain more by waiting. Howard and Chuck meet with their insurance agent, who proposes substantially raising their malpractice premiums or having another attorney supervise Chuck. Chuck refuses and Howard says he will force Chuck to retire. Chuck responds by suing for $8 million, the value of his share of HHM. Mike becomes a contracted security consultant for Madrigal Electromotive, and the monthly payments enable him to launder his stolen money. While Jimmy is suspended, Kim takes on a second client to earn additional income and becomes exhausted from overwork. Nacho admits to his father, Manuel, that he works for Hector and begs him to follow Hector's orders, but Manuel orders Nacho to leave his house. Jimmy manipulates the Sandpiper residents into believing Irene is holding out on them in regards to the Sandpiper settlements, ostracizing her until she accepts, meaning Jimmy will receive his share -- more than $1 million. Kim falls asleep while driving to a meeting with her new client and crashes into a boulder.
30	10	"Lantern"	Peter Gould	Gennifer Hutchison	June 19, 2017	1.85
In a flashback to their childhood, Chuck reads to Jimmy by lantern light. In 2003, Kim suffers a broken arm in the car accident. Jimmy agrees to break their office lease so Kim can save money by working from home. Chuck is forced out of HHM when Howard pays the first installment to buy him out. Hector bribes Manuel to use his business as a drug front, and Manuel reluctantly accepts. Nacho intends to ambush Hector but is caught in a meeting between Hector, Gus, and Juan Bolsa. Bolsa informs Hector that Eladio wants Salamanca drugs smuggled from Mexico in Gus' trucks to be a permanent arrangement. An enraged Hector suffers a stroke, and Gus resuscitates him back to life. Nacho replaces the fake capsules with Hector's real nitroglycerin, but Gus is suspicious. Jimmy tries making amends with Chuck, but Chuck refuses. Jimmy then tries mending relations between Irene and her friends, but when they refuse, he arranges for them to overhear him admit to tricking Irene into accepting the Sandpiper settlement, vindicating her and causing her to withdraw acceptance, but costing him his share of the settlement, and all his elder clients. Chuck's EHS symptoms re-emerge and he destroys his home's interior. That night, he intentionally sets a fire by knocking over a gas lantern, burning down the house and killing himself.

== Release ==
=== International broadcast ===
Outside the U.S. in certain international markets, season 3 was released on Netflix with episodes available the day after the episodes were broadcast on AMC.

=== Home media ===
The third season was released on Blu-ray and DVD in region 1 on January 16, 2018. The set contains all 10 episodes, plus audio commentaries for every episode and several behind-the-scenes featurettes.

== Reception ==
=== Critical response ===
Better Call Saul season 3: Critical reception by episode
Season 3 (2017): Percentage of positive critics' reviews tracked by the website Rotten Tomatoes

The third season of Better Call Saul, much like the previous two, received universal acclaim, particularly for McKean's performance as Chuck, and the character development of Jimmy McGill. On Rotten Tomatoes, the third season has an approval rating of 98% based on 175 reviews, with an average rating of 8.75/10. The site's critical consensus is: "Better Call Saul shows no signs of slipping in season 3, as the introduction of more familiar faces causes the inevitable transformation of its lead to pick up exciting speed." On the review aggregator website Metacritic, the season has a score of 87 out of 100 based on 18 critics, indicating "universal acclaim".

Terri Schwartz of IGN rated the third season 9.1/10, praising Jimmy's character development saying: "Better Call Saul was better than it's ever been in Season 3." Verne Gay of Newsday gave it an "A+" grade and wrote, "Based on the first two episodes, Saul is making a case that it could be even better than Breaking Bad."

==== Critics' top ten list ====
2017
- No. 1 NPR (Fresh Air)
- No. 1 TV by the Numbers
- No. 2 Yahoo!
- No. 4 The Hollywood Reporter (Daniel Fienberg)
- No. 5 Adweek
- No. 5 Uproxx
- No. 6 Complex
- No. 6 Thrillist
- No. 7 Vulture (Jen Chaney)
- No. 8 IndieWire
- No. 9 TV Guide
- – Salon.com
- – Vox

=== Ratings ===
Viewership and ratings per episode of Better Call Saul season 3
No.	Title	Air date	Rating (18–49)	Viewers (millions)	DVR (18–49)	DVR viewers (millions)	Total (18–49)	Total viewers (millions)
1	"Mabel"	April 10, 2017	0.7	1.81	1.0	2.25	1.7	4.06
2	"Witness"	April 17, 2017	0.5	1.46	1.0	2.30	1.5	3.76
3	"Sunk Costs"	April 24, 2017	0.5	1.52	0.9	1.95	1.4	3.47 (Note: Live +7 ratings were not available, so Live +3 ratings have been used instead.)
4	"Sabrosito"	May 1, 2017	0.6	1.56	—N/a	—N/a	—N/a	—N/a
5	"Chicanery"	May 8, 2017	0.6	1.76	1.0	2.41	1.6	4.16
6	"Off Brand"	May 15, 2017	0.6	1.72	1.1	2.47	1.7	4.19
7	"Expenses"	May 22, 2017	0.7	1.65	1.0	2.55	1.7	4.20
8	"Slip"	June 5, 2017	0.5	1.63	1.1	2.45	1.6	4.09
9	"Fall"	June 12, 2017	0.5	1.47	1.1	2.77	1.6	4.24
10	"Lantern"	June 19, 2017	0.6	1.85	0.9	2.34	1.5	4.19

== Accolades ==
Ceremony	Category	Recipients	Result
69th Primetime Creative Arts Emmy Awards	Outstanding Music Supervision	Thomas Golubić ("Sunk Costs")	Nominated
69th Primetime Creative Arts Emmy Awards	Outstanding Single-Camera Picture Editing for a Drama Series	Skip Macdonald ("Chicanery")	Nominated
69th Primetime Creative Arts Emmy Awards	Outstanding Single-Camera Picture Editing for a Drama Series	Kelley Dixon and Skip Macdonald ("Witness")	Nominated
69th Primetime Creative Arts Emmy Awards	Outstanding Sound Mixing for a Comedy or Drama Series (One Hour)	Phillip W. Palmer, Larry Benjamin, Kevin Valentine ("Witness")	Nominated
69th Primetime Emmy Awards	Outstanding Drama Series	Better Call Saul	Nominated
69th Primetime Emmy Awards	Outstanding Lead Actor in a Drama Series	Bob Odenkirk	Nominated
69th Primetime Emmy Awards	Outstanding Supporting Actor in a Drama Series	Jonathan Banks	Nominated
69th Primetime Emmy Awards	Outstanding Directing for a Drama Series	Vince Gilligan ("Witness")	Nominated
69th Primetime Emmy Awards	Outstanding Writing for a Drama Series	Gordon Smith ("Chicanery")	Nominated
75th Golden Globe Awards	Best Actor – Television Series Drama	Bob Odenkirk	Nominated
24th Screen Actors Guild Awards	Outstanding Performance by a Male Actor in a Drama Series	Bob Odenkirk	Nominated
70th Writers Guild of America Awards	Drama Series	Better Call Saul	Nominated
70th Writers Guild of America Awards	Episodic Drama	Gordon Smith ("Chicanery")	Won
70th Writers Guild of America Awards	Episodic Drama	Heather Marion ("Slip")	Nominated
22nd Satellite Awards	Best Supporting Actor in a Series, Miniseries or TV Film	Michael McKean	Won
54th Cinema Audio Society Awards	Outstanding Achievement in Sound Mixing for Television Series – One Hour	Phillip W. Palmer, Larry B. Benjamin, Kevin Valentine, Matt Hovland, and David Michael Torres ("Lantern")	Nominated
44th Saturn Awards	Best Action-Thriller Television Series	Better Call Saul	Won
44th Saturn Awards	Best Supporting Actor on Television	Michael McKean	Won
44th Saturn Awards	Best Supporting Actress on Television	Rhea Seehorn	Won

== Significance ==
=== Chuck's arc ===
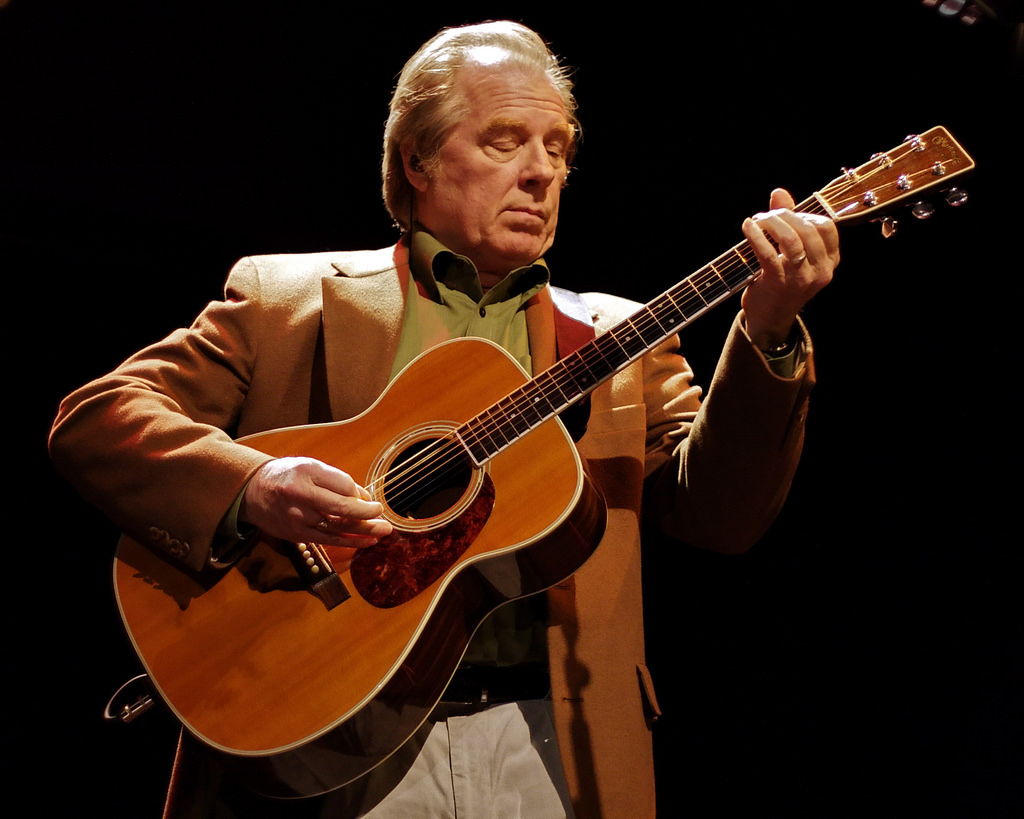
Michael McKean portrays Chuck McGill. McKean's performance throughout the third season received critical acclaim.

Jimmy tries to make amends with Chuck in the season finale "Lantern", but Chuck coldly cuts ties with Jimmy, telling him that "he never really mattered all that much to him". After Chuck forces Jimmy away, his EHS symptoms begin to re-emerge, and he becomes obsessed with disabling all electronic devices in his home to the point of tearing walls open to remove the wiring. He eventually reaches a breaking point and knocks a gas lantern over, setting fire to his house. After this scene, there was much speculation as to what happened to Chuck after the fire started. Showrunner Peter Gould said, "I don't want to define anything more than what's on screen".

Michael McKean, who played Chuck, told Vulture: "I got a call on my cell from Peter [Gould] [and] Vince [Gilligan]. I said, 'If this is the death call, I'm going to pull over.' And that's what I did. I pulled into the parking lot of the bookstore and I called them back and they told me what they had planned. They told me they had laughed about what I had said, but they had to deliver it". When asked if his character was dead, McKean said: "I am. I know they want to bring me in for some flashbacks this coming season, but that's kind of beside the point". As revealed in the fourth season's premiere, Howard notifies Jimmy and Kim about the fire, and they arrive at the scene just in time to see Chuck's body being taken away.

== Related media ==
=== Talking Saul ===
Talking Saul is a live aftershow hosted by Chris Hardwick, which features guests discussing episodes of Better Call Saul. These episodes discussed the third-season premiere and finale episodes of Better Call Saul.

=== Los Pollos Hermanos Employee Training ===
AMC released a series of ten short videos on YouTube and their social media accounts during season three as Los Pollos Hermanos Employee Training, combining live-action shots featuring Esposito as Gus along with animated segments, presented as in-universe employee training videos for Los Pollos Hermanos restaurant workers. The series won the Primetime Emmy Award for Outstanding Short Form Comedy or Drama Series in 2017.

=== No Picnic ===
On June 19, 2017, the night of Saul's season finale, fans were able to access the three-minute short film No Picnic, which feature the Kettlemans, who were not seen since the first season. The short, directed by Saul associate producer Jenn Carroll and written by the show's writers' assistant Ariel Levine, shows the Kettleman family organizing a picnic close to family patriarch Craig, who is seen picking up roadside litter with his fellow inmates as part of his prison sentence.

Fans were originally able to access No Picnic through Los Pollos Hermanos Employee Training, which directed fans to participate in a bingo trivia game on the show's digital and social platforms. The video was unlockable on June 12, 2017, but could not be viewed until a week later.
