= Off Brand (Better Call Saul) =

- Better Call Saul episode
- Episode no.: Season 3 Episode 6
- Directed by: Keith Gordon
- Written by: Ann Cherkis
- Original air date: May 15, 2017
- Running time: 47 minutes

Guest appearances
- Kerry Condon as Stacey Ehrmantraut; Max Arciniega as Domingo Molina; Ann Cusack as Rebecca Bois; Josh Fadem as Joey Dixon; Tamara Tunie as Anita; John Getz as The State Bar of New Mexico Committee Chairman; Tina Parker as Francesca Liddy; Jeremiah Bitsui as Victor; Ray Campbell as Tyrus Kitt; Juan Carlos Cantu as Manuel Varga; Hayley Holmes as Cheri The Make-Up Girl; Carol Herman as Geraldine Strauss; Quinn VanAntwerp as Robert Alley; Vincent Fuentes as Arturo Colon; Julian Bonfiglio as The Sound Guy; Mark Margolis as Hector Salamanca; Laura Fraser as Lydia Rodarte-Quayle

Episode chronology
| ← Previous "Chicanery" | Next → "Expenses" |
- Better Call Saul season 3

"Off Brand" is the sixth episode of the third season of the AMC television series Better Call Saul, the spinoff series of Breaking Bad. The episode aired on May 15, 2017, on AMC in the United States. Outside of the United States, the episode premiered on streaming service Netflix in several countries.

== Plot ==
Kim Wexler makes her closing argument to the bar association's disciplinary committee. Rebecca Bois tries to see Chuck McGill at his house, but he does not answer the door. The committee suspends Jimmy McGill for a year but does not disbar him. Later that night, Howard Hamlin tries to dissuade Chuck from continuing the vendetta and consider Jimmy's suspension a victory. Chuck seemingly agrees and after Howard leaves, Chuck is revealed to be holding a battery in an attempt to overcome his EHS symptoms.

Mike Ehrmantraut accompanies Stacey to a support group meeting, where she talks about how she and Kaylee are dealing with Matty's death. Stacey tells Mike she volunteered him to help build a playground for the church.

Realizing he will lose money if the TV ads for which he has pre-paid air as scheduled, Jimmy rushes to cancel them. The early cancellation will cost $4,000 plus penalties so he tries to find a use for the time. Cheri, one of the film crew, suggests he shoot a commercial for himself, pitching his ability to produce ads for other businesses. Chuck attempts to defeat his EHS by walking through downtown Albuquerque. He panics and uses a payphone to contact Dr. Cruz. Jimmy explains to Kim his intent to offer his services as producer and spokesman in ads for local businesses and shows Kim a videotape in which he wears a disguise and uses the alias "Saul Goodman".

Nacho Varga collects weekly street dealer payments for the Salamancas. Domingo Molina's is short, so Hector Salamanca prompts Nacho to administer a beating as a warning not to do it again. At the Los Pollos Hermanos farm, Nacho and Arturo inspect cocaine bricks and choose the Salamancas' portion, but Nacho attempts to take six instead of the agreed-upon five. Tyrus Kitt calls Gus Fring, who says to give Nacho the sixth kilo. Gus is inspecting an industrial laundry facility that is for sale and after ending the call he tells Lydia Rodarte-Quayle, "It could work".

Hector tells Nacho he plans to use his father Manuel's upholstery shop as a new front business, which concerns Nacho. Hector is outraged to learn that Tuco Salamanca's prison term will be extended because he stabbed another inmate. His anger causes a coughing fit and Hector spills his angina medication. After Hector picks them up Nacho notices one capsule left behind, which he keeps.

== Production ==
The episode was directed by Keith Gordon and written by Ann Cherkis, who previously wrote the season 2 episode "Rebecca".

Laura Fraser briefly reprises her Breaking Bad role as Lydia Rodarte-Quayle, Gus's business associate. In a Q&A with AMC, Fraser distinguished the Better Call Saul version of Lydia from that of Breaking Bad's remarking, "She hasn't started unraveling. She feels really secure and confident in her place in the world, and she even experiences moments of happiness and contentment. She's ambitious and enjoying her profession. She still has this air of irritability that betrays her genuine comfort levels, but she hasn't yet started to fray." The episode also features the first chronological appearance of Lavandería Brillante, the industrial laundry that serves as a front for Gus' meth lab in Breaking Bad.

== Reception ==
=== Ratings ===
Upon airing, this episode was watched by 1.72 million American viewers and received an 18–49 rating of 0.6 dipping one tenth from a 0.7 in the previous week. With Live+7 viewing factored in, the episode had an overall audience of 4.19 million viewers, and a 1.7 18–49 rating.

=== Critical reception ===
The episode received critical acclaim. On the site Rotten Tomatoes, it received a 100% rating with an average score of 8.35/10 based on 13 reviews. The site consensus reads "'Off Brand' adds another well-written, solidly crafted chapter to Better Call Saul's terrific third season—as well as a reminder that even the show's transitional episodes are compelling."
