= Slip (Better Call Saul) =

- Better Call Saul episode
- Episode no.: Season 3 Episode 8
- Directed by: Adam Bernstein
- Written by: Heather Marion
- Original air date: June 5, 2017
- Running time: 48 minutes

Guest appearances
- Clea DuVall as Dr. Lara Cruz; Mel Rodriguez as Marco Pasternak; Max Arciniega as Krazy-8 Molina; Rex Linn as Kevin Wachtell; Cara Pifko as Paige Novick; Josh Fadem as Joey Dixon; Frank Deal as The Parks Supervisor; Shahine Ezell as Freddy; Tina Parker as Francesca Liddy; Hayley Holmes as The Make Up Girl; Juan Carlos Cantu as Manuel Varga; Jason Sklar as Ryan; Randy Sklar as Rick; Julian Bonfiglio as The Sound Guy; Mark Margolis as Hector Salamanca

Episode chronology
← Previous "Expenses"	Next → "Fall"
- Better Call Saul season 3

"Slip" is the eighth episode of the third season of the AMC television series Better Call Saul, a spin-off series of Breaking Bad. The episode aired on June 5, 2017, on AMC in the United States. Outside of the United States, the episode premiered on the streaming service Netflix in several countries.

== Plot ==
=== Opening ===
In a flashback, Jimmy McGill and Marco Pasternak break into the McGills' abandoned store in Cicero, Illinois. Hoping to use an Indian-head penny for a con, Jimmy recovers his childhood coin collection. He explains that he started his collection following his father's futile attempt to return a rare coin to its owner after the owner mistakenly used it at the store.

=== Main story ===
Mike Ehrmantraut drives to the site where he committed the ice-cream truck robbery. (Note: As seen in "Nailed".) Using information Nacho Varga provided, he finds the body of the Good Samaritan who was killed after freeing Ximenez Lecerda. He then makes an anonymous call and reports the location to the police.

At home, Chuck McGill tells Dr. Cruz about his progress towards addressing his electromagnetic hypersensitivity and his hopes for rebuilding his life, but confides in her about the events of the hearing and his suspicions that his EHS is psychosomatic. Dr. Cruz advises him not to try to do too much too soon, but he later leaves the house to buy groceries. On his return, Howard Hamlin informs him there is an issue with Chuck's malpractice insurance.

After Jimmy produces a successful commercial for a music store, the owners refuse to pay. Jimmy resorts to a "Slippin' Jimmy" con to create a slip-and-fall accident. Howard greets Kim Wexler at her lunch with Paige and Kevin. Kim tries to pay back the law school tuition loan she owes HHM. Howard declines and accuses her of betraying the firm. Kim replies that he should not have tried to cover up Chuck's condition.

Kim returns to the office to find Jimmy with his half of the rent, which he got from the music store owners. Kim expresses doubts about Jimmy's ability to continue paying and considers taking on another client. Jimmy later makes $700 while performing his community service, which he earns by threatening the supervisor with a class-action lawsuit, enabling a drug dealer also doing community service to leave early.

Nacho executes his plan to kill Hector Salamanca by stealing the nitroglycerin bottle from Hector's jacket pocket and replacing the contents with lookalike capsules containing ibuprofen. He then returns the bottle to Hector's pocket without being noticed.

Mike realizes he cannot spend the money he stole from Hector without attracting suspicion, so he seeks Gus Fring’s help in laundering it. Gus warns him they should avoid being publicly associated so the Salamancas do not get suspicious. He tells Mike the laundering process will be difficult but agrees to help.

== Production ==
The episode is directed by Adam Bernstein, who previously directed the second season episode "Gloves Off", and written by Heather Marion, who co-wrote "Klick", the second season finale, with creator Vince Gilligan.

=== Casting ===
The episode marks the return of Mel Rodriguez as Jimmy's friend Marco Pasternak, after a season-long absence, and Clea DuVall as Dr. Cruz, who last appeared in "Klick".

== Reception ==
=== Ratings ===
Upon airing, the episode received 1.633 million American viewers, and an 18–49 rating of 0.5.

=== Critical reception ===
The episode received critical acclaim. It holds a 100% rating on Rotten Tomatoes based on 12 reviews with an average score 9.03/10. The site's consensus reads, "'Slip' continues Better Call Saul's character evolution with another gripping episode taking the series' story in unpredictable yet satisfying new directions." Terri Schwartz of IGN gave a 9.2 rating, saying "The acting and direction is top notch in 'Slip,' even if this episode didn't surpass 'Chicanery' as the best episode of the season. It's a strong installment as Season 3 grows closer to the end." James White of Empire rated the episode 4/5 stars, noting the episode "represents yet another great episode, full of little Saul touches, including two wonderful montages—Mike in the desert, shown in time-lapse with his metal detector, and Nacho's careful pill preparation—examples of the show's continued ability to make the most mundane actions dramatic and watchable."
