= Sunk Costs (Better Call Saul) =

- Better Call Saul episode
- Episode no.: Season 3 Episode 3
- Directed by: John Shiban
- Written by: Gennifer Hutchison
- Editing by: Skip Macdonald
- Original air date: April 24, 2017
- Running time: 45 minutes

Guest appearances
- JB Blanc as Dr. Barry Goodman; Kimberly Hébert Gregory as DDA Kyra Hay; Molly Hagan as Judge Lindsay Arch; Tina Parker as Francesca Liddy; John Christian Love as Ernesto; Jeremiah Bitsui as Victor; Ray Campbell as Tyrus Kitt; Peter Diseth as DDA Bill Oakley; Jackamoe Buzzell as PI Dave Brightbill

Episode chronology
← Previous "Witness"	Next → "Sabrosito"
- Better Call Saul season 3

"Sunk Costs" is the third episode of the third season of the AMC television series Better Call Saul, the spinoff series of Breaking Bad. The episode aired on April 24, 2017 on AMC in the United States. Outside of the United States, the episode premiered on streaming service Netflix in several countries. The title of the episode is a reference to sunk costs.

== Plot ==
After following his planted tracking device's signal (Note: As seen in "Witness") to an empty stretch of highway, Mike Ehrmantraut answers the cell phone left with it in the middle of the road, and agrees to the caller's request that no guns be displayed. Two cars approach from opposite directions; Gus Fring exits one, and he and Mike discuss their concerns about Hector Salamanca. They agree that Gus will no longer track Mike, and Mike will no longer try to kill Hector. Gus is amenable to Mike's continued disruption of Hector's drug business, and Mike suggests a way to draw police attention to Hector without killing him.

Mike travels to Mexico and acquires cocaine from Barry Goodman, stows it in a sneaker and throws the pair over a power line that spans a road he knows Hector's trucks use. When the next truck comes, the drivers stop to stash their weapons prior to being searched at the border crossing. Using a rifle with a scope, Mike fires a few rounds into the air to give the drivers the impression that it is a nearby hunter. As the truck pulls away, Mike fires at the sneaker holding the cocaine, which causes the powder to spill onto the back of the truck. At the border crossing, drug-sniffing dogs discover the cocaine, and the drivers are taken into custody.

Jimmy McGill is arrested for breaking into Chuck McGill's house. Jimmy goes against Kim Wexler's advice and represents himself, pleads not guilty, and posts bail. He later tells her she should work on Mesa Verde business while he takes care of his own legal battle, to which she flatly agrees.

Kyra Hay, the prosecutor in Jimmy's case, tells Chuck she will pursue Jimmy's charges aggressively, but Chuck suggests a different solution. Jimmy informs Kim that Chuck's idea is that rather than face prosecution, Jimmy will submit to the New Mexico Bar Association a written confession to the break in, which will enable Jimmy to avoid prison but will likely result in his disbarment. Kim changes her mind and persuades Jimmy to let her help defend him.

== Reception ==
=== Ratings ===
Upon airing, the episode received 1.52 million American viewers, and an 18–49 rating of 0.5.

=== Critical reception ===
The episode received critical acclaim, on Rotten Tomatoes, the episode holds a 100% rating with an average score of 8.09/10, based on 13 reviews. The site's consensus reads, '"Sunk Costs" edges Better Call Saul toward a narrative crossroads, foreshadowing events familiar to Breaking Bad fans while serving up gripping drama in its own right'.

Terri Schwartz of IGN gave the episode an 8.0 rating, writing "Whose storyline is going to come crashing down around them first: Jimmy or Mike?"

For his work on this episode, Thomas Golubić was nominated for Outstanding Music Supervision at the 69th Primetime Creative Arts Emmy Awards.
