= Chicanery (Better Call Saul) =

- Better Call Saul episode
- Jimmy McGill (left) interrogates his brother Chuck (right) in front of the New Mexico Bar Association. Kim Wexler (center background) is serving as Jimmy's co-counsel.
- Episode no.: Season 3 Episode 5
- Directed by: Daniel Sackheim
- Written by: Gordon Smith
- Editing by: Skip Macdonald
- Original air date: May 8, 2017
- Running time: 49 minutes

Guest appearances
- Ann Cusack as Rebecca Bois; Rex Linn as Kevin Wachtell; Cara Pifko as Paige Novick; Joe DeRosa as Dr. Caldera; John Getz as The State Bar of New Mexico Committee Chairman; Michael Chieffo as Commissioner Ughetta; Tina Parker as Francesca Liddy; Quinn VanAntwerp as Robert Alley; Jackamoe Buzzell as PI Dave Brightbill; Lavell Crawford as Huell Babineaux

Episode chronology
| ← Previous "Sabrosito" | Next → "Off Brand" |
- Better Call Saul season 3

"Chicanery" is the fifth episode of the third season of the AMC television series Better Call Saul, the spinoff series of Breaking Bad. The episode aired on May 8, 2017, on AMC in the United States.

In the episode, the New Mexico Bar Association hears an argument over whether Jimmy McGill (Bob Odenkirk) should be disbarred over sabotaging a business partnership made by his brother, Chuck (Michael McKean). Jimmy and his co-counsel, Kim Wexler (Rhea Seehorn), attempt to prove that he lied on tape about sabotaging the deal in order to make Chuck feel better about his alleged condition of electromagnetic hypersensitivity.

Outside of the United States, the episode premiered on streaming service Netflix in several countries. It received universal critical acclaim, with many reviewers considering it the best episode of the series at its release.

== Plot ==
=== Opening ===
In a flashback to 2001, Jimmy McGill aids Chuck McGill as he attempts to reconcile with Rebecca Bois during dinner at Chuck's house. Rebecca does not know that Chuck believes he suffers from electromagnetic hypersensitivity (EHS) and answers a call on her cellular phone, which causes Chuck to panic and knock the phone out of her hands.

=== Main story ===
In 2003, Jimmy meets Dr. Caldera and asks if he knows "someone with a light touch" who is willing to do a job. After a successful hearing before the banking board, Kim Wexler informs Paige Novick and Kevin Wachtell of Chuck's allegations that Jimmy tampered with Mesa Verde documents, which they dismiss as Chuck's anger at making a mistake.

The bar association's attorney intends to use Jimmy's taped confession and Chuck will testify to its authenticity, allowing Kim and Jimmy to cross-examine him. She suggests in her opening that the real story is not Jimmy's supposed crimes, but the feud between Jimmy and Chuck.

The hearing room is arranged to accommodate Chuck's EHS. Howard Hamlin testifies that Chuck did not want to hire Jimmy as an attorney at the Hamlin, Hamlin, & McGill (HHM) law firm, supposedly to avoid the appearance of nepotism. Kim points out that HHM hired Howard even though he was the founding partner's son. Jimmy's confession is then played for the committee.

Chuck arrives to testify and bumps into Huell Babineaux. To Chuck's surprise, Rebecca arrives. She explains that Jimmy contacted her out of concern for Chuck's well-being, but Chuck tells her Jimmy called her as a psychological tactic to disrupt Chuck's testimony.

During cross-examination, Jimmy raises Chuck's EHS and asks him to identify the closest source of electricity. Suspecting a trick, Chuck guesses Jimmy has something electronic in his pocket. Jimmy reveals his cell phone; Chuck notes that Jimmy removed the battery, and claims this is why he does not feel his EHS symptoms. Jimmy then asks Chuck to reach into his own pocket; Chuck pulls out the phone battery and recoils in shock. Jimmy announces that Huell planted it, and though Chuck has carried it for nearly two hours, he has not been affected. When the bar association's attorney argues that Chuck's apparent mental illness is irrelevant, Chuck retorts sharply that he is "not crazy", flying into a rambling tirade about Jimmy's "chicanery". He trails off mid-sentence, realizing he has shocked everyone, including the panel, into silence.

== Production ==
The episode is directed by Daniel Sackheim, a first-time director on the show, and written by Gordon Smith, who previously wrote the season 2 episode "Inflatable".

This episode is the first time Jonathan Banks, who had appeared in every episode in the series up to that point, did not make an appearance as Mike. Lavell Crawford reprises his role as Huell Babineaux from Breaking Bad after last appearing in the season 5 episode "To'hajiilee".

== Reception ==
=== Ratings ===
Upon airing, the episode received 1.76 million American viewers, and an 18–49 rating of 0.7. With Live+7 viewing factored in, the episode had an overall audience of 4.16 million viewers, and a 1.6 18–49 rating.

=== Critical reception ===
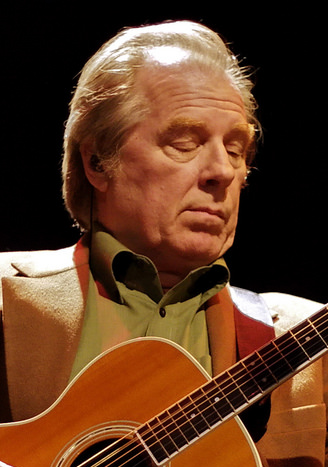
Michael McKean was praised for his performance in the final scene.

The episode received universal acclaim from critics, with many considering it to be one of the best of the series. Terri Schwartz of IGN awarded the episode 10 out of 10, describing it as "the best episode of Better Call Saul to date". It holds a 100% on Rotten Tomatoes with an average of 9.5/10 based on 14 reviews. The site consensus reads: "The war between Jimmy and Chuck comes to an unprecedented climax in the heartbreaking, sober, and defining 'Chicanery', an episode that clearly cements Better Call Saul as essential television."

TVLine named Michael McKean the "Performer of the Week" for his performance in this episode, writing it was the "finest showcase yet for his fascinatingly layered performance as Jimmy's brother Chuck McGill." Donna Bowman of The A.V. Club, who gave the episode an "A" rating, praised the courtroom scene, saying, "It isn't just to give us the satisfaction of a courtroom drama, the neat ending where the truth comes out. The brilliance of this structure is to give us a slow-motion view of the heavens falling, an outcome methodically pursued by Kim and Jimmy, which nevertheless seems to give them no satisfaction."

At the 69th Primetime Emmy Awards, Skip Macdonald was nominated for Outstanding Single-Camera Picture Editing for a Drama Series, and Gordon Smith was nominated for Outstanding Writing for a Drama Series for this episode, his second for the series. Smith was awarded the Writers Guild of America Award for Episodic Drama. Many critics were disappointed when McKean, who was said to have given "one of the best performances by anyone in TV all year", failed to secure an Emmy nomination while his co-star Jonathan Banks did.

=== Analysis ===
The episode's final scene is an homage to the climactic courtroom scene in The Caine Mutiny, in which a suspicious, authoritarian, by-the-book Navy captain cracks under cross-examination. Uproxx noted that even the facial expressions of "Chicanery's" three committee members mirror those of three judges in Caine. (The film—which Vince Gilligan counts among his favorites—is also referenced in the Breaking Bad episode "Madrigal", in which Mike can be seen watching it.)

== In popular culture ==
In the early 2020s, Chuck's monologue at the end of the episode would become the subject of many Internet memes.
