= Witness (Better Call Saul) =

- Better Call Saul episode
- Episode no.: Season 3 Episode 2
- Directed by: Vince Gilligan
- Written by: Thomas Schnauz
- Editing by: Skip Macdonald
- Original air date: April 17, 2017
- Running time: 49 minutes

Guest appearances
- John Christian Love as Ernesto; Tina Parker as Francesca Liddy; Jeremiah Bitsui as Victor; Jackamoe Buzzell as PI Dave Brightbill; Giancarlo Esposito as Gustavo Fring

Episode chronology
← Previous "Mabel"	Next → "Sunk Costs"
- Better Call Saul season 3

"Witness" is the second episode of the third season of the AMC television series Better Call Saul, the spinoff series of Breaking Bad. The episode aired on April 17, 2017 on AMC in the United States. Outside the United States, the episode premiered on streaming service Netflix in several countries.

== Plot ==
=== Opening ===
Chuck McGill converses with David Brightbill, a private investigator who is playing solitaire. After turning down the lantern that illuminates the room, Chuck stares out the window.

=== Main story ===
Mike Ehrmantraut observes the two individuals he followed from his house give the tracking device from his car to a courier. (Note: As seen in "Mabel".) He follows the courier to various spots around town, eventually arriving at Los Pollos Hermanos. Mike's monitor shows that the tracker remains stationary.

Francesca Liddy arrives at Wexler-McGill for a job interview. Jimmy McGill wants her to start immediately as their new receptionist since he has a new commercial airing soon and needs her to field incoming calls. After the ad airs, Jimmy coaches Francesca through two calls, one of which is from Mike. Jimmy agrees to meet Mike the next morning.

Mike tasks Jimmy with observing the interior of Los Pollos Hermanos when the courier arrives. After the courier disposes of his trash, Jimmy inspects the bin. The owner of the restaurant, Gus Fring, appears and asks if Jimmy needs help. Jimmy drops his watch in the trash and claims it fell in, and Gus helps find it. Jimmy tells Mike he saw nothing suspicious. As they drive away, Gus looks up knowingly.

Victor later drives away from the restaurant. Mike follows him, with Mike's monitor indicating the tracking device is in Victor's car. When the tracker is stationary, Mike finds a ringing cell phone placed atop his gas cap in the middle of the road. He picks up the phone and answers it.

Ernesto tells Kim Wexler he heard Jimmy's taped confession. (Note: As seen in "Klick".) Kim tells Jimmy that Chuck taped him. She realizes Chuck cannot use the confession in court and suggests that Jimmy wait for Chuck to make the first move so they can determine his intent, but Jimmy angrily drives away.

Howard Hamlin sneaks to the back door of Chuck's house and Chuck lets him in. Chuck reveals he intentionally allowed Ernesto to hear the tape, knowing he would tell Kim and Jimmy. Chuck predicts Jimmy will break into his house to destroy the tape, enabling him to have Jimmy arrested. As Chuck guessed, Jimmy kicks in the door and expresses anger that Chuck tricked him by playing to Jimmy's concern for Chuck's health. Jimmy destroys the tape and Howard and David make their presence known. They declare themselves witnesses, enabling Chuck to report Jimmy to the police.

== Production ==
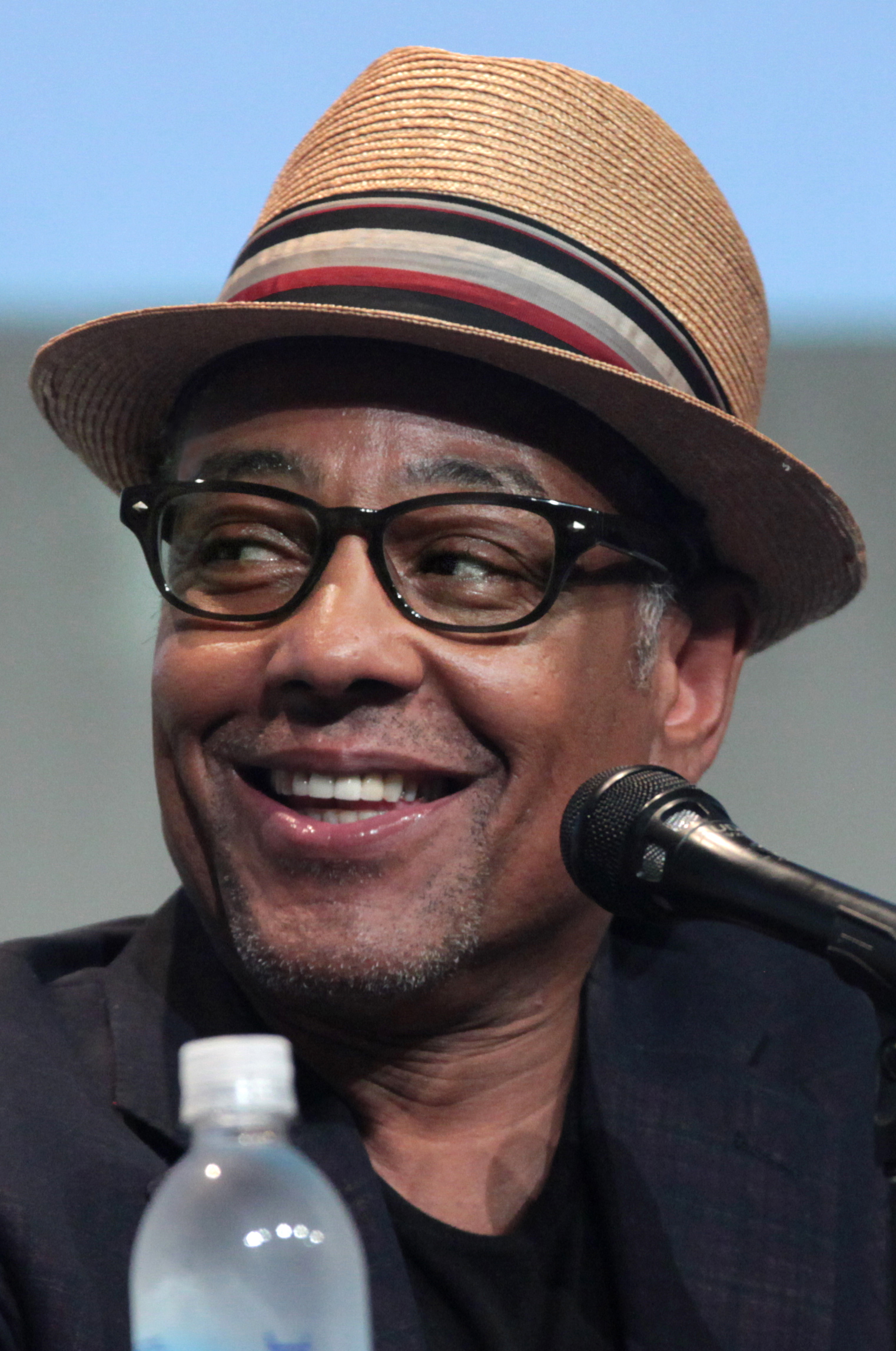
After much speculation about his character's return, Giancarlo Esposito reprised his role as Gus Fring

The episode was directed by the series creator Vince Gilligan and was written by executive producer Thomas Schnauz, who previously wrote the season 2 episode "Fifi".

This episode features the return of three Breaking Bad cast members: Giancarlo Esposito (Gus Fring), Tina Parker (Saul's secretary Francesca Liddy), and Jeremiah Bitsui (Gus's henchman Victor). In a Q&A with AMC, Esposito expressed excitement about his return to the Breaking Bad world, saying, "I'm extremely excited. I'm over the moon. I love this family of filmmakers a great deal. I know Better Call Saul is a little bit of a different show than Breaking Bad was and I love the success it's had. It has such wonderful talent in the show. Bob Odenkirk is just stellar. Obviously the opportunity to tell some of the backstory of Gus and how he rose to power and how he came to be is always something I've wanted to explore in a very subtle way in the right venue." He also distinguished the show's version of Gus from the original show, describing his character as "a little fresher, a little less jaded. The time period alone takes us to a time where his look may be little bit different. I wanted him to be little more hopeful, a little more energetic, maybe not as definitive in some of his actions because he's a Gus that we've never met before."

== Reception ==
=== Ratings ===
Upon airing, the episode received 1.46 million American viewers, and an 18–49 rating of 0.5.

=== Critical reception ===
The episode received critical acclaim, with some praising the return of Breaking Bad antagonist Gus Fring. On Rotten Tomatoes, the episode holds a perfect 100% rating with an average score of 9.09/10, based on 13 reviews. The site's consensus reads, '"Witness" marks the long-awaited arrival of a fan favorite character—and ends on an explosive note that leaves viewers clamoring for more.'

The episode received four Primetime Emmy Award nominations including Outstanding Directing for a Drama Series for Gilligan, Outstanding Supporting Actor in a Drama Series for Jonathan Banks, Outstanding Sound Mixing for a Comedy or Drama Series (One-Hour), and Outstanding Single-Camera Picture Editing for a Drama Series.
