= Gordon Smith (screenwriter) =

American screenwriter

- Born: Michigan, U.S.
- Education: University of Michigan; University of Southern California (MFA)
- Occupation: Screenwriter
- Years active: 2008–present
- Known for: Breaking Bad; Better Call Saul

Gordon Smith is an American screenwriter, best known for his work with Vince Gilligan on the television dramas Breaking Bad, Better Call Saul and Pluribus.

Smith has been nominated for four individual Primetime Emmy Awards for Outstanding Writing for a Drama Series, and won the Writers Guild of America Award for Television: Episodic Drama for the Better Call Saul episode "Chicanery", among other accolades and nominations.

== Early life ==
Smith was born in Michigan and grew up in the West Bloomfield area of Metro Detroit. He attended the University of Michigan as well as the University of Southern California's School of Cinematic Arts, graduating in 2008 with Master of Fine Arts degree in film and television production.

== Career ==
Smith started as an office production assistant for season 3 of Breaking Bad, then became Vince Gilligan's assistant in season 4, and the writers' assistant in season 5. Smith co-wrote the Breaking Bad mini-featurette titled Chicks 'N' Guns which was released on the fifth season Blu-ray.

Smith was then hired as a staff writer for the Breaking Bad spinoff Better Call Saul. His first television script, for the episode "Five-O" (from season 1) earned him a Primetime Emmy Award nomination for Outstanding Writing for a Drama Series. He also wrote episode 8 from the first season, titled "RICO". For the second season of Better Call Saul, Smith was promoted to story editor and wrote two episodes, "Gloves Off" and "Inflatable". In the third season, he was promoted to a producer, and wrote another two episodes, "Chicanery" and "Fall". The episode "Chicanery" earned Smith his second Primetime Emmy Award nomination for Outstanding Writing for a Drama Series, and won the Writers Guild of America Award for Television: Episodic Drama.

In April 2017, Smith signed with Sony Pictures Television, where he served as a consulting producer for the WGN America television series Outsiders and was confirmed to return to Better Call Saul for its fourth season. For season 4, Smith was promoted to supervising producer and wrote two episodes, "Something Beautiful" and "Coushatta". For the fifth season, Smith was promoted co-executive producer and wrote two episodes, "Namaste" and "Bagman". Smith also made his directorial debut with the episode "Namaste". For the sixth and final season, Smith continued as a co-executive producer and wrote the third ("Rock and Hard Place") and eighth ("Point and Shoot") episodes while also directing the former episode. He was nominated for his third and fourth Primetime Emmy Awards for Outstanding Writing for a Drama Series for the episodes "Bagman" and "Point and Shoot" respectively.

Smith is an executive producer and wrote two episodes for Vince Gilligan's Apple TV+ series Pluribus, which premiered in November 2025.

== Filmography ==
=== Television ===
Year	Title	Director	Producer	Writer	Notes
2025	Pluribus	Yes	Yes	Yes	3 directing episodes; 9 producing episodes; 2 writing episodes
2020–2022	Better Call Saul	Yes	Yes	Yes	2 directing episodes; executive producer, co-executive producer and supervising producer (43 episodes); 28 writing episodes; story editor
2017	Outsiders	No	No	Yes	2 writing episodes; story editor
2013	Talking Bad	No	Yes	No	Consulting producer; 8 episodes
2011	Breaking Bad: Original Minisodes	No	No	Yes	2 writing episodes
2008–2009	The Scary City	No	No	Yes	Writer

=== Television miniseries ===
Year	Title	Director	Producer	Writer	Notes
2022	Better Call Saul Presents: Slippin' Jimmy	No	Yes	No	Executive producer; 6 episodes

=== Video ===
Year	Title	Director	Producer	Writer	Notes
2013	Breaking Bad: Chicks 'n' Guns	No	No	Yes	Writer
2013	Chicks 'N' Guns: Behind the Scenes	No	No	Yes	Writer

== Accolades ==
Year	Ceremony	Category	Episode / Work	Result	Ref.
2015	67th Primetime Emmy Awards	Outstanding Writing for a Drama Series	"Five-O"	Nominated	
2016	68th Writers Guild of America Awards	Drama Series	Better Call Saul; shared with writing staff	Nominated	
2016	68th Writers Guild of America Awards	New Series	Better Call Saul; shared with writing staff	Nominated	
2017	69th Primetime Emmy Awards	Outstanding Writing for a Drama Series	"Chicanery"	Nominated	
2017	69th Primetime Emmy Awards	Outstanding Drama Series	Better Call Saul; shared with production staff	Nominated	
2017	69th Writers Guild of America Awards	Drama Series	Better Call Saul; shared with writing staff	Nominated	
2017	69th Writers Guild of America Awards	Episodic Drama	"Gloves Off"	Nominated	
2018	70th Writers Guild of America Awards	Drama Series	Better Call Saul; shared with writing staff	Nominated	
2018	70th Writers Guild of America Awards	Episodic Drama	"Chicanery"	Won	
2019	71st Primetime Emmy Awards	Outstanding Drama Series	Better Call Saul; shared with production staff	Nominated	
2020	72nd Primetime Emmy Awards	Outstanding Writing for a Drama Series	"Bagman"	Nominated	
2020	72nd Primetime Emmy Awards	Outstanding Drama Series	Better Call Saul; shared with production staff	Nominated	
2022	74th Primetime Emmy Awards	Outstanding Drama Series	Better Call Saul; shared with production staff	Nominated	
2023	75th Primetime Emmy Awards	Outstanding Writing for a Drama Series	"Point and Shoot"	Nominated	
2026	21st Seoul International Drama Awards	Best Director (Note: shared with Vince Gilligan)	Pluribus (season 1)	Won	
