= Expenses (Better Call Saul) =

- Better Call Saul episode
- Episode no.: Season 3 Episode 7
- Directed by: Thomas Schnauz
- Written by: Thomas Schnauz
- Editing by: Skip Macdonald
- Original air date: May 22, 2017
- Running time: 52 minutes

Guest appearances
- Kerry Condon as Stacey Ehrmantraut; Mark Proksch as Daniel Wormald; Cara Pifko as Paige Novick; Josh Fadem as Joey Dixon; Jean Villepique as Doreen Valco; Frank Deal as The Parks Supervisor; Tamara Tunie as Anita; Hayley Holmes as The Make-Up Girl; Raymond McAnally as Phil Brady; Jason Sklar as Ryan; Randy Sklar as Rick; Julian Bonfiglio as The Sound Guy; Abigail Zoe Lewis as Kaylee Ehrmantraut

Episode chronology
← Previous "Off Brand"	Next → "Slip"
- Better Call Saul season 3

"Expenses" is the seventh episode of the third season of the AMC television series Better Call Saul, the spinoff series of Breaking Bad. The episode aired on May 22, 2017 on AMC in the United States. Outside of the United States, the episode premiered on streaming service Netflix in several countries.

== Plot ==
Jimmy McGill picks up garbage as part of his community service. At the same time, he uses his cell phone to conduct business for his television advertising company "Saul Goodman Productions". At the end of his four-hour shift, his supervisor credits Jimmy with only thirty minutes. Jimmy shoots a commercial for a reclining chair store but the owner declines Jimmy's offer to shoot more. Jimmy gives Kim Wexler the money for his share of their office expenses, which concerns her because she thinks he might be exhausting his savings.

Paige Novick praises Kim's cross-examination of Chuck McGill at the hearing, which led to Chuck's meltdown. (Note: As depicted in "Chicanery") Kim expresses regret for having destroyed Chuck's reputation. During dinner with Jimmy, Kim briefly plays along with a con but makes sure he knows they are not going to follow through. When Kim wonders whether they did the right thing by causing Chuck's meltdown, Jimmy replies that what happened was Chuck's own fault.

Jimmy tries to obtain a refund on his malpractice insurance premium. The agent is unable to comply because he needs to be covered if someone accuses him of past malpractice while his license is suspended. Jimmy begins crying and mentions Chuck's mental breakdown; he sneers as he leaves, aware that he has caused a problem for Chuck.

Nacho Varga breaks into Daniel Wormald's house and offers him $20,000 to obtain empty capsules that look like Hector Salamanca's nitroglycerin. Mike Ehrmantraut helps construct a playground for Stacey's church and accepts help from other support group members, including Anita. That night, Daniel asks Mike to be his bodyguard again, but Mike refuses.

At the support group, Mike befriends Anita after she recounts how her husband mysteriously disappeared. The story persuades Mike to protect Daniel when he meets Nacho. Nacho tells Mike that Hector wants to use his father's shop as a front but that his father would refuse and go to the police, which would cause Hector to kill him. Nacho intends to kill Hector by switching his heart medication for fakes. Mike advises Nacho that if Hector dies, Nacho should replace the fakes with Hector's real medication so the cause of his death will not be obvious.

== Reception ==
=== Ratings ===
Upon airing, the episode received 1.65 million American viewers, and an 18–49 rating of 0.7. With Live+7 viewing factored in, the episode had an overall audience of 4.2 million viewers, and a 1.7 18–49 rating.

=== Critical reception ===
The episode received critical acclaim. On Rotten Tomatoes, it garnered a 93% rating with an average score of 8.63/10 based on 14 reviews. The site consensus reads, "An award-worthy lead performance among a torrent of quality drama and sharp dialogue add up to a winning showcase for Better Call Saul's continued evolution." Bob Odenkirk submitted this episode for consideration for the Primetime Emmy Award for Outstanding Lead Actor in a Drama Series for the 69th Primetime Emmy Awards.
