= Twisters (restaurant) =

Fast food company based in Albuquerque

Twisters Burgers & Burritos

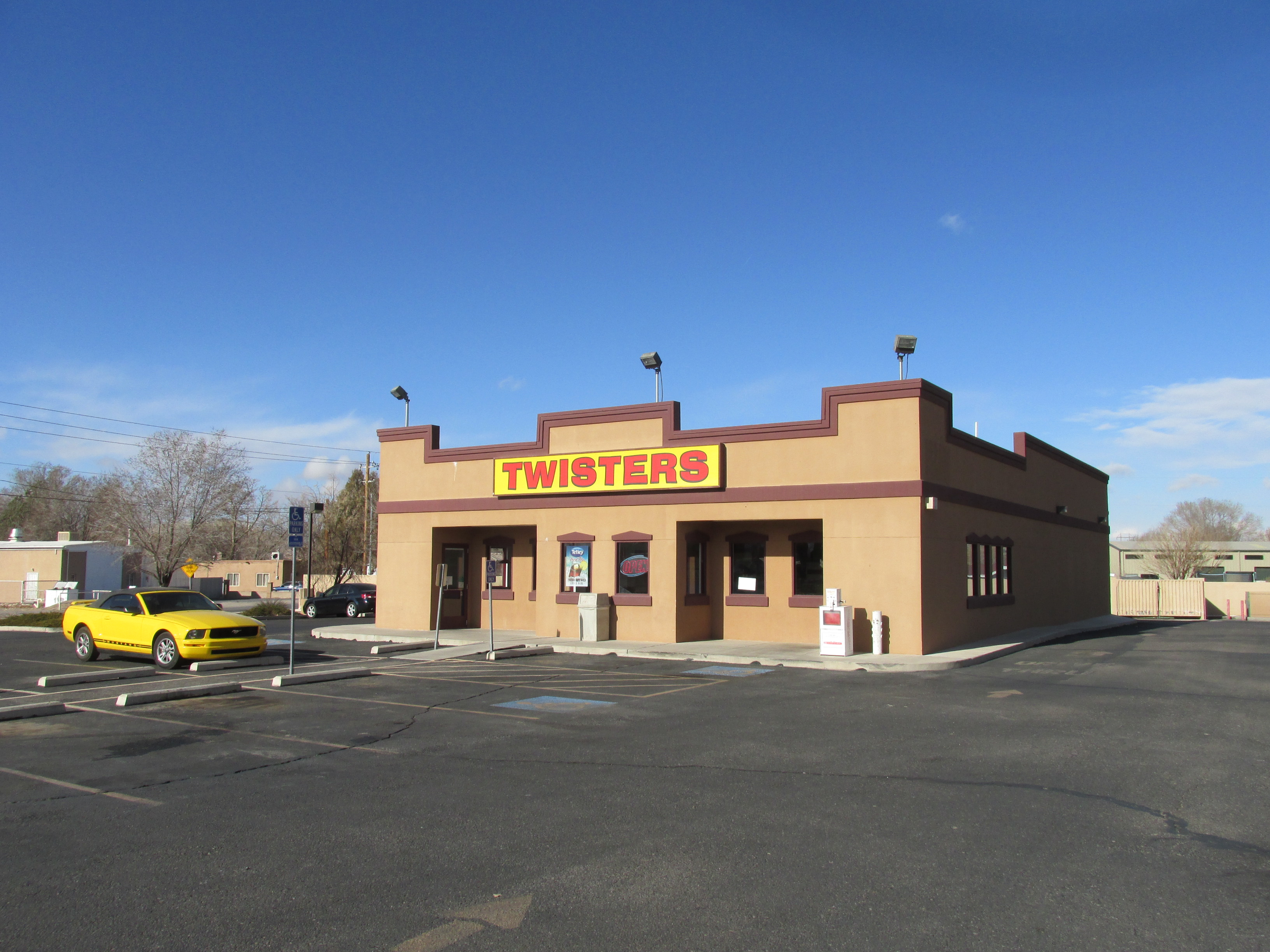
- The Twisters used in Breaking Bad and Better Call Saul to represent Los Pollos Hermanos
- Type: Privately held
- Industry: Fast food
- Founded: Albuquerque, New Mexico, 1998
- Headquarters: Albuquerque, New Mexico, United States
- Number of locations: 18 in New Mexico; 2 in Colorado
- Area served: New Mexico and Colorado
- Products: New Mexican cuisine
- Website: www.mytwisters.com

Twisters is a New Mexican cuisine restaurant chain from the city of Albuquerque, New Mexico, which was founded in 1998.

== Today ==
Twisters is known for their green chile cheeseburgers and burritos. They also serve other New Mexican staples like sopapillas, enchiladas, fried apple bites, tacos, french fries, rice, and beans.

== Reception ==
They won Albuquerque The Magazine's "Best of the City" Best Burrito award four times in a row from 2010 to 2013.

== In popular culture ==
The location at 4275 Isleta Boulevard SW in Albuquerque is best known for its appearance in the AMC dramas Breaking Bad and Better Call Saul as an outlet of Gus Fring's fast food chicken chain Los Pollos Hermanos. Its real-life counterpart makes a brief cameo in the film sequel, El Camino.
