= Skip Macdonald =

American editor

- Occupation: Editor
- Years active: 1980–present

Skip Macdonald is an American film and television editor known for his work on Breaking Bad (2008–2013), its spin-off series Better Call Saul (2015–2022), and the 2019 film El Camino: A Breaking Bad Movie. He also edited several episodes of the TV series Fargo. In 2014, at the 66th Primetime Emmy Awards, he won the Primetime Emmy Award for Outstanding Picture Editing for a Drama Series for the Breaking Bad series finale episode Felina.

== Career ==
Skip Macdonald began his career as an assistant sound editor in the 1980s. During this time, he worked on Heaven's Gate (1980), Things Are Tough All Over, and the Carl Reiner-directed Dead Men Don't Wear Plaid (1982) and The Man with Two Brains (1983). After completing Cheech & Chong's The Corsican Brothers in 1984, Macdonald made his second collaboration with filmmaker Michael Cimino, after Heaven's Gate, with Year of the Dragon in 1985.

Macdonald's first project serving as an assistant film editor was in 1988's television film Little Girl Lost. In the following years, he assisted with the editing of Harley Davidson and the Marlboro Man (1991), the Perry Mason film The Case of the Killer Kiss (1993), White Fang 2: Myth of the White Wolf and Nell (1994), Kansas and In Pursuit of Honor (1995), and Primal Fear (1996). In 1997, Macdonald had his "big break" after becoming an editor for Buffy the Vampire Slayer.

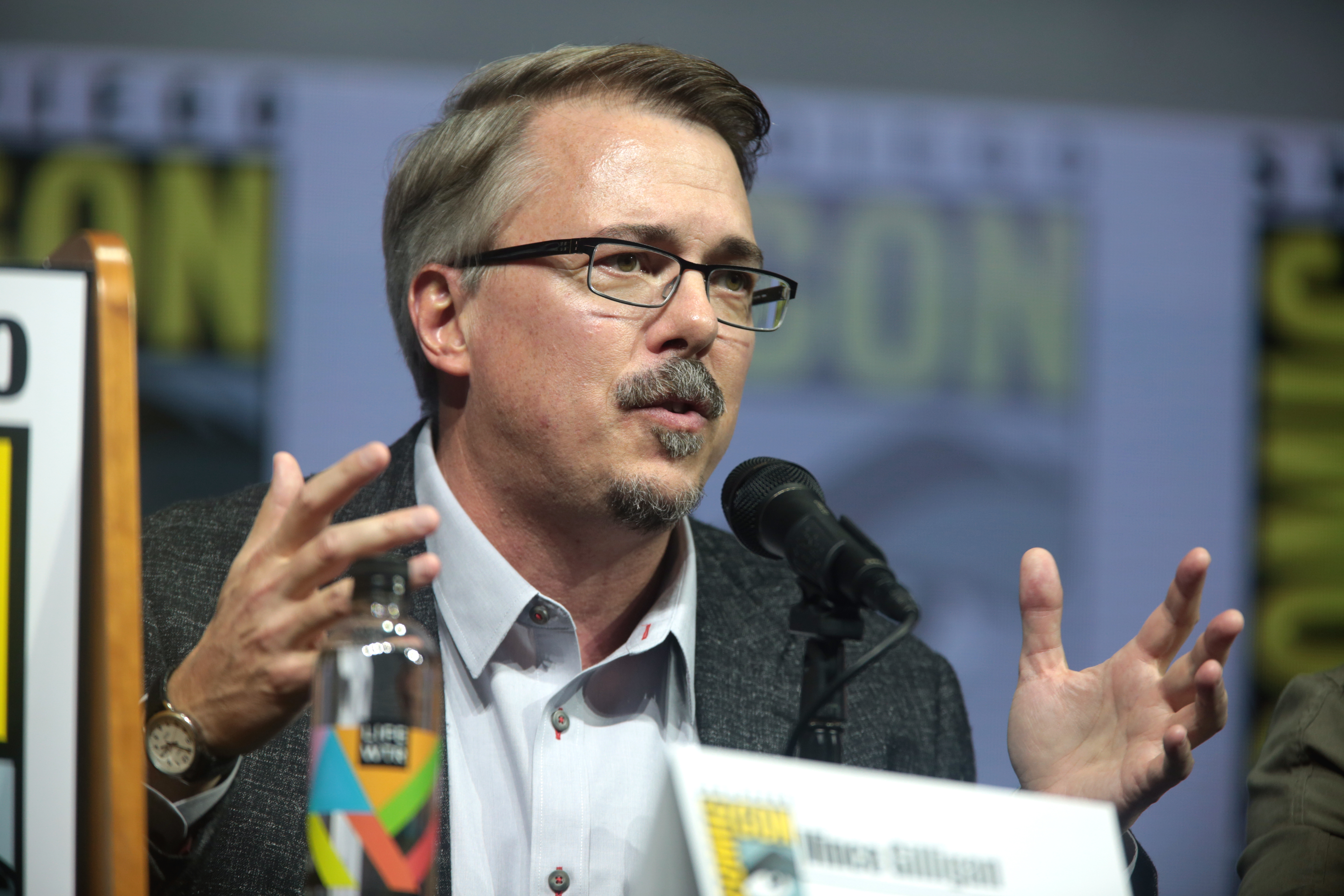
Macdonald has collaborated with Vince Gilligan (pictured) three times.

In 2008, Macdonald began editing the Vince Gilligan-created series Breaking Bad, a show that received universal acclaim and earned Macdonald (following three other nominations) the Primetime Emmy Award for Outstanding Single-Camera Picture Editing for a Drama Series in 2014 for his work on the series finale. That same year, he worked on the drama series Fargo and earned three nominations for the Primetime Emmy Award for Outstanding Single-Camera Picture Editing for a Limited Series or Movie. Macdonald made his second collaboration with Gilligan on the Breaking Bad spin-off series Better Call Saul, which earned him two more Emmy Award nominations. In 2019, he made his third collaboration with Gilligan on the Netflix film El Camino, a sequel to Breaking Bad centered on the character of Jesse Pinkman. The film, which also received universal acclaim from critics, earned Macdonald his tenth and most recent Primetime Emmy Award nomination.

== Filmography ==
=== Film ===
Year	Title	Director	Credited as
1980	Heaven's Gate	Michael Cimino	Assistant sound editor
1982	Things Are Tough All Over	Thomas K. Avildsen	Assistant sound editor
1982	Dead Men Don't Wear Plaid	Carl Reiner	Assistant sound editor
1983	The Man with Two Brains	Carl Reiner	Assistant sound editor
1984	Cheech & Chong's The Corsican Brothers	Tommy Chong	Assistant sound editor
1985	Year of the Dragon	Michael Cimino	Assistant sound editor
1991	Harley Davidson and the Marlboro Man	Simon Wincer	Assistant film editor
1994	White Fang 2: Myth of the White Wolf	Ken Olin	Assistant editor
1994	Nell	Michael Apted	Lightworks assistant editor
1996	Primal Fear	Gregory Hoblit	Assistant film editor
1996	A Very Brady Sequel	Arlene Sanford	Assistant film editor
2006	Drake & Josh Go Hollywood	Steve Hoefer	Assistant editor
2007	Super Sweet 16: The Movie	Neema Barnette	Editor
2011	Low Fidelity	Devon Gummersall	Editor
2013	Over/Under	Bronwen Hughes	Editor
2019	El Camino: A Breaking Bad Movie	Vince Gilligan	Editor

=== Television ===
Year	Title	Notes
1988	Little Girl Lost	Assistant film editor; television film
1988	Police Story: Cop Killer	Assistant film editor; television film
1993	Perry Mason: The Case of the Killer Kiss	Assistant editor; television film
1995	Kansas	Associate editor; television film
1995	In Pursuit of Honor	Co-editor; television film
1997–1999	Buffy the Vampire Slayer	Also assistant editor
2000	2gether: The Series	
2001	The Chronicle	1 episode
2001–2002	Special Unit 2	2 episodes
2003	Hunter: Back in Force	Television film
2005–2007	Las Vegas	Also assistant editor
2006	Weeds	Episode: "Crush Girl Love Panic"
2007	Big Shots	2 episodes
2008–2013	Breaking Bad	Episodes Season 1: "Crazy Handful of Nothin'"; Season 2: "Grilled", "Bit by a Dead Bee", "Better Call Saul", "Mandala"; Season 3: "No Más", "I.F.T.", "Más", "One Minute", "Kafkaesque", "Abiquiu", "Full Measure"; Season 4: "Box Cutter", "Open House", "Shotgun", "Problem Dog", "Bug", "Crawl Space", "Face Off"; Season 5: "Live Free or Die", "Hazard Pay", "Dead Freight", "Say My Name", "Buried", "Rabid Dog", "Ozymandias", "Felina"
2011	Glory Daze	1 episode
2011	Hell on Wheels	Episode: "Hell on Wheels"
2013	Low Winter Sun	4 episodes
2014–2015	Fargo	Episodes Season 1: "The Crocodile's Dilemma", "Eating the Blame", "Who Shaves the Barber?", "Morton's Fork"; Season 2: "Waiting for Dutch", "Fear and Trembling", "Did You Do This? No, You Did It!", "Palindrome"
2015–2022	Better Call Saul	Episodes Season 1: "Uno", "Nacho", "Alpine Shepherd Boy", "Bingo", "Pimento"; Season 2: "Fifi", "Klick"; Season 3: "Mabel", "Witness", "Sunk Costs", "Chicanery", "Expenses", "Fall"; Season 4: "Smoke", "Something Beautiful", "Quite a Ride", "Something Stupid", "Wiedersehen"; Season 5: "50% Off", "Namaste", "Wexler v. Goodman", "Bagman", "Something Unforgivable"; Season 6: "Carrot and Stick", "Black and Blue", "Plan and Execution", "Fun and Games", "Breaking Bad", "Saul Gone"
2016	American Gothic	1 episode
2017	A Series of Unfortunate Events	4 episodes
2018	Here and Now	3 episodes
2019	Chambers	3 episodes
2021	Foundation	2 episodes
2025	Pluribus	

== Accolades ==
Awards and nominations received by Skip Macdonald
Award	Year (Note: The listed year refers to the date of the ceremony, not necessarily the year in which the corresponding season or episode aired.)	Category	Work	Result	Ref.
Eddie Awards	2012	Best Edited Drama Series for Commercial Television	"Face Off" (Breaking Bad)	Won	
Eddie Awards	2013	Best Edited Drama Series for Commercial Television	"Dead Freight" (Breaking Bad)	Won	
Eddie Awards	2014	Best Edited Drama Series for Commercial Television	"Felina" (Breaking Bad)	Won	
Eddie Awards	2014	Best Edited Drama Series for Commercial Television	"Buried" (Breaking Bad)	Nominated (Note: Nominated with Sharidan Williams-Sotelo)	
Eddie Awards	2014	Best Edited Drama Series for Commercial Television	"Ozymandias" (Breaking Bad)	Nominated	
Eddie Awards	2016	Best Edited Drama Series for Commercial Television	"Uno" (Better Call Saul)	Nominated	
Eddie Awards	2016	Best Edited Drama Series for Commercial Television	"Did You Do This? No, You Did It!" (Fargo)	Nominated (Note: Nominated with Curtis Thurber)	
Eddie Awards	2017	Best Edited Drama Series for Commercial Television	"Fifi" (Better Call Saul)	Nominated	
Eddie Awards	2017	Best Edited Drama Series for Commercial Television	"Klick" (Better Call Saul)	Nominated (Note: Nominated with Chris McCaleb)	
Eddie Awards	2018	Best Edited Drama Series for Commercial Television	"Chicanery" (Better Call Saul)	Nominated	
Eddie Awards	2018	Best Edited Drama Series for Commercial Television	"Witness" (Better Call Saul)	Nominated (Note: Nominated with Kelley Dixon)	
Eddie Awards	2019	Best Edited Drama Series for Commercial Television	"Something Stupid" (Better Call Saul)	Nominated	
Primetime Emmy Awards	2010	Outstanding Single-Camera Picture Editing for a Drama Series	"No Más" (Breaking Bad)	Nominated	
Primetime Emmy Awards	2012	Outstanding Single-Camera Picture Editing for a Drama Series	"Face Off" (Breaking Bad)	Nominated	
Primetime Emmy Awards	2013	Outstanding Single-Camera Picture Editing for a Drama Series	"Dead Freight" (Breaking Bad)	Nominated	
Primetime Emmy Awards	2014	Outstanding Single-Camera Picture Editing for a Drama Series	"Felina" (Breaking Bad)	Won	
Primetime Emmy Awards	2014	Outstanding Single-Camera Picture Editing for a Limited Series or Movie	"The Crocodile's Dilemma (Fargo)	Nominated	
Primetime Emmy Awards	2016	Outstanding Single-Camera Picture Editing for a Limited Series or Movie	"Did You Do This? No, You Did It!" (Fargo)	Nominated (Note: Nominated with Curtis Thurber)	
Primetime Emmy Awards	2016	Outstanding Single-Camera Picture Editing for a Limited Series or Movie	"Waiting for Dutch" (Fargo)	Nominated	
Primetime Emmy Awards	2017	Outstanding Single-Camera Picture Editing for a Drama Series	"Chicanery" (Better Call Saul)	Nominated	
Primetime Emmy Awards	2017	Outstanding Single-Camera Picture Editing for a Drama Series	"Witness" (Better Call Saul)	Nominated	
Primetime Emmy Awards	2020	Outstanding Single-Camera Picture Editing for a Limited Series or Movie	El Camino: A Breaking Bad Movie	Nominated	
Peabody Awards	2022	Entertainment	Better Call Saul	Won	

== See also ==
- List of Primetime Emmy Award winners
