= Gloves Off =

- Better Call Saul episode
- Episode no.: Season 2 Episode 4
- Directed by: Adam Bernstein
- Written by: Gordon Smith
- Original air date: March 7, 2016
- Running time: 43 minutes

Guest appearances
- Ed Begley Jr. as Clifford Main; Jim Beaver as Lawson; Omar Maskati as Omar; Raymond Cruz as Tuco Salamanca; Max Arciniega as Krazy-8 Molina

Episode chronology
| ← Previous "Amarillo" | Next → "Rebecca" |
- Better Call Saul season 2

"Gloves Off" is the fourth episode of the second season of the AMC television series Better Call Saul. The episode aired on March 7, 2016, on AMC in the United States. Outside of the United States, the episode premiered on Netflix in several countries.

== Plot ==
=== Opening ===
Mike Ehrmantraut returns home and tosses a stack of hundred-dollar bills onto his kitchen table, pulls a bag of frozen vegetables from his freezer and presses it to his face. As he slowly sinks into his living room chair, his face is revealed to be badly bruised and beaten.

=== Main story ===
The Davis & Main partners chastise Jimmy for airing his TV ad without their consent. (Note: As seen in "Amarillo".) Clifford Main decides to give him a second chance, though he will be under more scrutiny in the future. Jimmy McGill leaves Kim Wexler an urgent voicemail, but Howard Hamlin and Chuck McGill are already grilling her about not warning them before Jimmy's ad aired. She takes responsibility for not letting them know in advance, claiming that she did not think it was necessary. Howard reprimands her and she promises it will not happen again.

Jimmy attempts to apologize to Kim, but finds she has been relegated to menial document review as punishment. Jimmy goes to confront Chuck but finds him shivering on his couch, so sits with him all night. The next morning, Jimmy condemns Chuck for allowing Howard to reprimand Kim. Chuck tells Jimmy he causes harm to everyone around him, but cannot admit his own mistakes. Jimmy offers to quit practicing law if Chuck will help Kim, but Chuck refuses.

Nacho Varga and Mike monitor a restaurant and Nacho says he fears retaliation from Tuco Salamanca if Tuco discovers his secret drug dealing. (Note: As seen in "Pimento".) Nacho tells Mike he and Tuco meet there to settle accounts with their street dealers, so he thinks it is an ideal place to kill Tuco. Mike initially considers buying a gun from Lawson, but ultimately refuses to kill Tuco, saying it would attract retaliation by the Salamancas. Instead, Mike calls the police to the restaurant, then fakes a minor accident between his car and Tuco's in the parking lot. When Tuco confronts Mike about it, Mike goads Tuco into striking him repeatedly just as police arrive. Because Tuco was carrying a gun, he is arrested for assault with a deadly weapon. Nacho later pays Mike, but Mike declines to give a reason for going to such trouble to avoid killing Tuco.

== Reception ==
=== Ratings ===
Upon airing, the episode received 2.20 million American viewers, and an 18–49 rating of 0.9.

=== Critical reception ===
The episode received acclaim from critics. Based on reviews from 15 critics, it has an approval rating of 100%, with an average score of 8.76 out of 10 on the review aggregation website Rotten Tomatoes. The site's critical consensus reads: "'Gloves Off' finds Better Call Saul coming further into its own with an enthralling episode that highlights Jonathan Banks' contributions."

Terri Schwartz of IGN gave the episode a 9.2 rating, writing: "Better Call Saul highlights the need for a better way."
