= Pluribus =

Pluribus may refer to:

- E pluribus unum, the motto of the United States
- Pluribus (novel), a science fiction work by Michael Kurland
- Pluribus (poker bot), the first computer poker player to win against a group of professional human players
- Pluribus (TV series), an American post-apocalyptic science fiction television series
- BBN Pluribus, an early multi-processor computer
