= Los Pollos Hermanos =

Fictional fast food establishment

- Breaking Bad, Better Call Saul location
- Logo
- First appearance: Breaking Bad: "Mandala" (2009); Better Call Saul: "Witness" (2017)
- Last appearance: Breaking Bad: "Madrigal" (2012); Better Call Saul: "Point and Shoot" (2022)
- Created by: Vince Gilligan; George Mastras

In-universe information
- Type: Restaurant
- Location: 14 different locations, with the most notable in Albuquerque, New Mexico

Los Pollos Hermanos (Spanish pronunciation: [los ˌpoʝos eɾˈmanos]; lit. 'The Chicken Brothers') is a fictional fast food restaurant chain specializing in fried chicken that was featured in the television series Breaking Bad and its spin-off Better Call Saul. In addition, the restaurant is mentioned in many training videos created to further expand the universe of the show. In the fictional universe of Breaking Bad, Los Pollos Hermanos is featured as a front organization for Gus Fring's methamphetamine manufacturing and distribution, but is also highly regarded by the general public of the Southwest as a regional chain on par with KFC. The set used for the restaurant's Albuquerque location in the show was at a series of Twisters locations in South Valley, New Mexico. As a result of this, Twisters has seen an increase in business attributed to being associated with Breaking Bad. Due to the show's popularity, Los Pollos Hermanos has appeared on numerous occasions as a real-life pop-up restaurant. The real life restaurant, also located in Albuquerque, New Mexico, also serves the same menu items as in the show.

== In-universe history ==
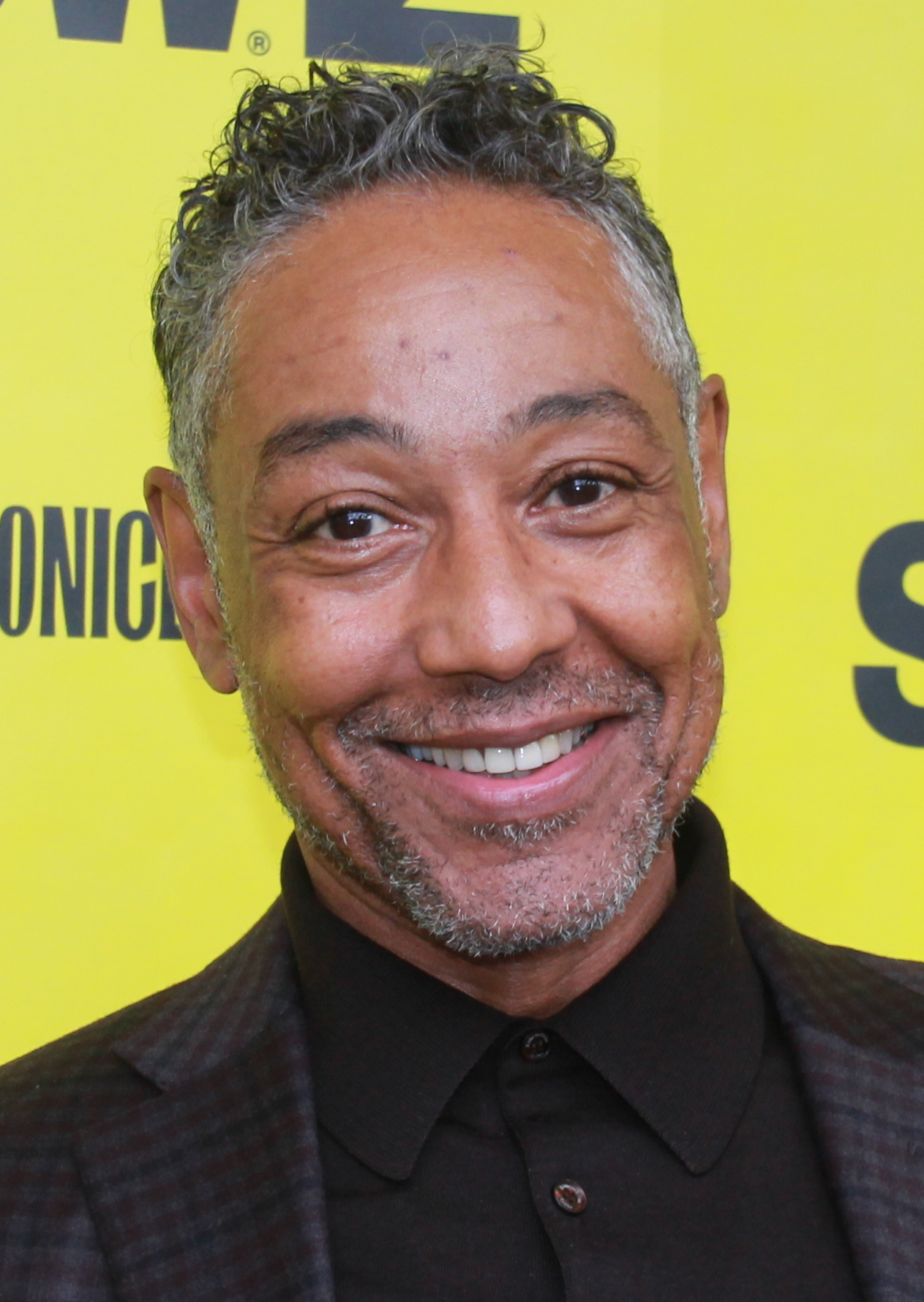
Giancarlo Esposito plays Gus Fring, the owner of Los Pollos Hermanos.

Los Pollos Hermanos was founded by Chilean nationals and business partners Gus Fring (played by Giancarlo Esposito) and Max Arciniega (James Martinez) in Mexico. An apocryphal story as told in a fictional television commercial suggests that it was inspired by recipes cooked by Gus' uncles. Eventually, Gus emigrated to the United States and opened branches primarily in New Mexico, and the chain grew to have 14 locations throughout the American Southwest. Los Pollos Hermanos trucks were used to smuggle drugs manufactured by the show's fictional drug cartel across the Mexico–United States border. A large chicken farm for Los Pollos Hermanos at the outskirts of Albuquerque served as a front where the incoming meth was processed and shipped to the various stores and other destinations. Fring kept the restaurants themselves clean of any business related to drugs.

The company eventually became a subsidiary of a fictional German conglomerate, Madrigal Electromotive GmbH, whose connections Fring used to further increase the outreach of both his legal and illegal operations. After Fring's death at the hands of Walter White (Bryan Cranston) and Hector Salamanca (Mark Margolis), the chain was closed, with the flagship restaurant in Albuquerque being replaced with a Twisters (the same restaurant which is used as the filming set in real-life).

== Real-life history ==
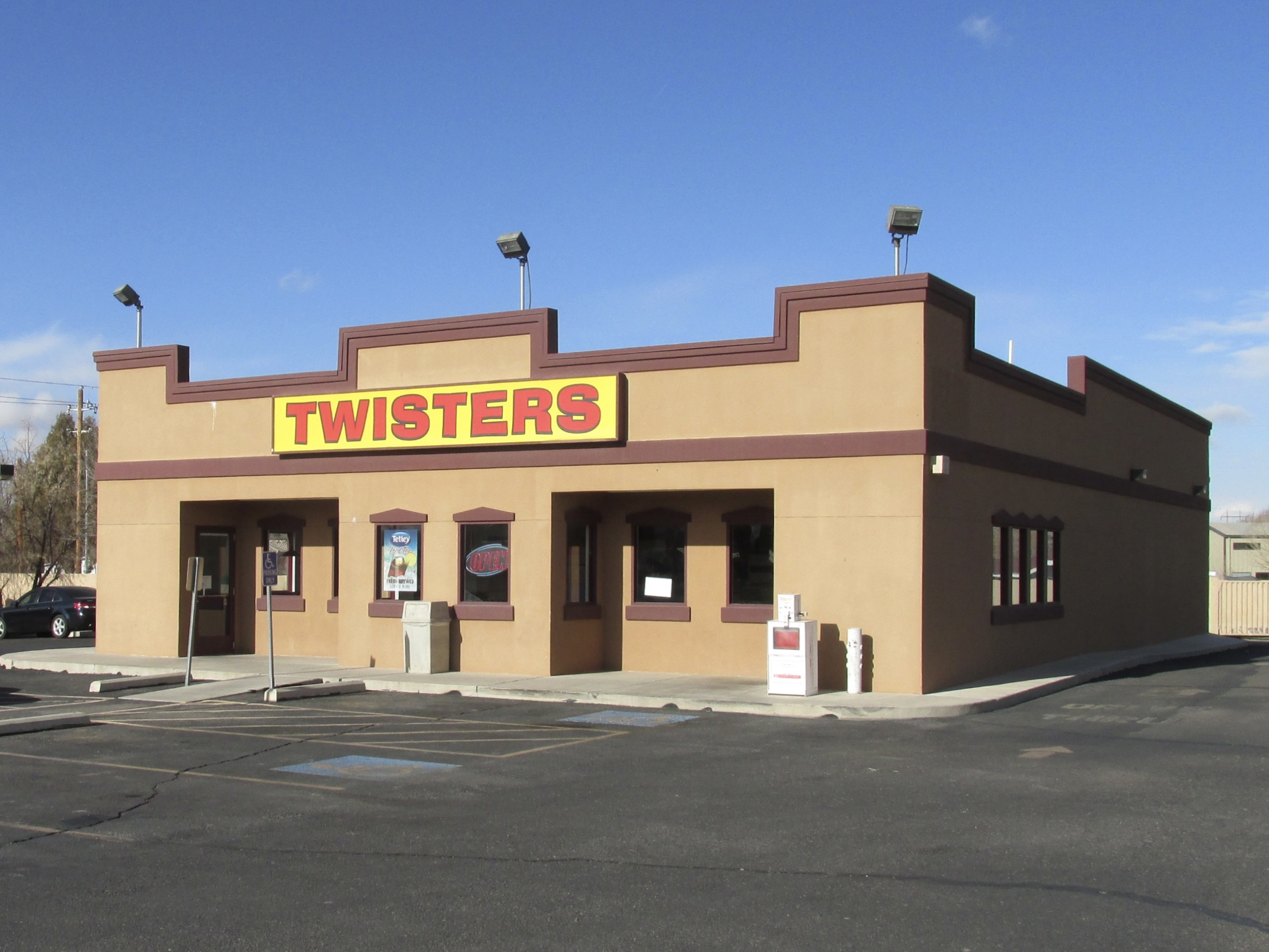
The Twisters store in Albuquerque used for the flagship Los Pollos Hermanos store during the filming of Breaking Bad and Better Call Saul

While Breaking Bad was still being aired in 2013, Twisters claimed to have received a 10% increase in revenue due to its association with Breaking Bad.

In 2014, a Cook County, Illinois man was arrested and charged with several crimes including the manufacturing of methamphetamine, and wore a Los Pollos Hermanos shirt in his mugshot. Breaking Bad creator Vince Gilligan revealed on a 2015 Reddit AMA that there were talks at Sony to make Los Pollos Hermanos into a real restaurant.

The logo for Los Pollos Hermanos was created in 2008 by Mexican artist Humberto Puentes-Segura. Topanga Productions, a subsidiary of Sony Pictures, the producer of Breaking Bad, began selling merchandise including T-shirts and hats displaying the Los Pollos Hermanos logo. In 2016, Puentes-Segura sued Sony Pictures and Topanga Productions, claiming he did not permit Sony to license or sell merchandise using the logo.

In 2017 Los Pollos Hermanos opened as a series of pop-up restaurants across several cities. It was announced to open from April 9–10 in New York City on Pearl Street, although the pop-up only offered curly fries and not chicken at all, possibly to avoid NYC Health violations. It also appeared in Los Angeles on April 10–11, and Austin, Texas for South by Southwest. On April 11–12, a pop-up event occurred at Thirsty Bird in Potts Point, New South Wales, with Giancarlo Esposito making a visit on the first day. Netflix, the international distributor for the series, also organized two separate pop-up events in Italy on May 12–13 at real fried chicken restaurants in Rome and Milan which were decorated to look like Los Pollos Hermanos restaurants.

In 2017, the Los Pollos Hermanos Employee Training miniseries was released as a promotion for Better Call Saul Season 3. It won the award for Short Form Comedy or Drama Series at the 69th Primetime Creative Arts Emmy Awards.

On January 20, 2018, to celebrate the 10th anniversary of the beginning of Breaking Bad, the Twisters location used to film the restaurant on the show was temporarily renovated for a single day to look like Los Pollos Hermanos. The occasion was paid for by "superfans" Edward Candelaria and Marq Smith, and was allegedly unsanctioned by Sony Pictures or AMC. The event also coincided with the beginning of filming for Better Call Saul Season 4, and several Breaking Bad cast members, including Ian Posada (Brock Cantillo) and Jeremiah Bitsui (Victor), appeared at the event.

In August 2018, Postmates offered a limited-time delivery service for Los Pollos Hermanos in Los Angeles and New York City.

In late 2019 the "Breaking Bad Experience" pop-up restaurant operated on 7100 Santa Monica Boulevard in West Hollywood, California, and included items reminiscent of Los Pollos Hermanos. A few days later, it was announced that delivery kitchen network Family Style Inc. partnered with Sony Pictures Consumer Products and began being offering Los Pollos Hermanos through Uber Eats in select markets, starting with Los Angeles. A pop-up location in Venice Beach, California also opened on October 24, 2019, for the premiere of El Camino: A Breaking Bad Movie.

The food court at the University of Aberdeen previously featured a fried chicken outlet with Los Pollos Hermanos branding.

A takeaway in the East Lancashire town Accrington has the name Los Pollos Hermanos.

== See also ==
- Bubba Gump Shrimp Company, restaurant inspired by characters from Forrest Gump
- Big Kahuna Burger, a fictional burger chain featured in films created by Quentin Tarantino and Robert Rodriguez
- The Double R Diner, a fictional restaurant featured in the TV show Twin Peaks
- El Pollo Loco, a real-life chain in the Southwestern U.S. that sells Mexican-style chicken
- Krusty Krab, a fictional restaurant in the children's animated series SpongeBob SquarePants
- Mel's Diner, a fictional restaurant featured in the TV show Alice
