= Professional liability insurance =

Professional liability insurance (PLI), also called professional indemnity insurance (PII) and commonly known as errors & omissions (E&O) in the US, is a form of liability insurance which helps protect professional advising, consulting, and service-providing individuals and companies from bearing the full cost of defending against a negligence claim made by a client in a civil lawsuit. The coverage focuses on alleged failure to perform on the part of, financial loss caused by, and error or omission in the service or product sold by the policyholder. These are causes for legal action that would not be covered by a more general liability insurance policy which addresses more direct forms of harm. Professional liability insurance may take on different forms and names depending on the profession, especially medical and legal, and is sometimes required under contract by other businesses that are the beneficiaries of the advice or service.

Coverage almost always provides for the defense costs, including when legal action turns out to be groundless. Coverage does not include criminal prosecution, nor a wide range of potential liabilities under civil law that are not enumerated in the policy, but which may be subject to other forms of insurance. Professional liability insurance is required by law in some areas for certain kinds of professional practice.

== Rationale ==
The primary reason for professional liability coverage is that a typical general liability insurance policy will respond only to a bodily injury, property damage, personal injury or advertising injury claim. Other forms of insurance cover employers, public and product liability. However, various professional services and products can give rise to legal claims without causing any of the specific types of harm covered by such policies. Common claims that professional liability insurance covers are negligence, misrepresentation, violation of good faith, and inaccurate advice. Examples:

- If a software product fails to perform properly or as-intended, it may not cause physical, personal, or advertising damages. Therefore, the general liability policy would not be triggered; it may, however, directly cause financial losses which could potentially be attributed to the software developer's misrepresentation of the product capabilities.
- If a custom-designed product fails without causing damage to person or property other than to the subject product itself, a product liability policy may cover consequential damages such as losses from business interruption, but will generally not cover the cost to redesign, repair or replace the failed product itself. Claims for these losses against the manufacturer may be covered by a professional liability policy.

== Coverage ==
Professional liability insurance policies are generally set up based on a claims-made and reported basis, meaning that the policy covers only those claims made and reported to their carrier during the policy period. More specifically a typical policy will provide indemnity to the insured against loss arising from any claim or claims made during the policy period by reason of any covered error, omission or negligent act committed in the conduct of the insured's professional business during the policy period. Claims which may relate to incidents occurring before the coverage was active may not be covered, although some policies may have a retroactive date, such that claims made during the policy period but which relate to an incident after the retroactive date (where the retroactive date is earlier than the inception date of the policy) are covered. Retroactive cover is usually offered as an additional option to include cover within a policy for work one has already done or services one has already provided.

Coverage does not include criminal prosecution, nor all forms of legal liability under civil law, only those specifically enumerated in the policy. Unlike general liability coverage, professional liability coverage extends coverage for acts that are intentional, so long as the damages caused were not intentional.

Some policies are more tightly worded than others. While a number of policy wordings are designed to satisfy a stated minimum approved wording, which makes them easier to compare, others differ dramatically in the coverage they provide. For example, a breach of duty may be included if the incident occurred and was reported by the policyholder to the insurer during the policy period. Wordings with major legal differences can be confusingly similar to non-lawyers. Coverage for "negligent act, error or omission" indemnifies the policyholder against loss/circumstances incurred only as a result of any professional error or omission, or negligent act (i.e., the modifier "negligent" does not apply to all three categories, though any non-legal reader might assume that it did). A "negligent act, negligent error or negligent omission" clause is a much more restrictive policy and would deny coverage in a lawsuit alleging a non-negligent error or omission.

Coverage is usually continued for as long as the policyholder provides covered services or products, plus the span of any applicable statute of limitations. Canceling the policy before this time would in effect make it as if the insured never had coverage for any incidents since any client could bring any case with regard to any such services or products that occurred before the statute of limitations cut-off point. A break in coverage could result in what is called a "gap in coverage", which is the loss of all prior acts.

== Differences across professions ==
=== Medical profession ===
The negligent act is called medical malpractice and the insuring contract is called malpractice insurance.

=== Legal profession ===
The negligent act is called legal malpractice and the insuring contract is called lawyers professional liability insurance. or LPL

Malpractice coverage is very important to attorneys because a bad case can produce a lot of bad publicity that can significantly harm a law firm's reputation. Nearly all LPL policies are claims made. Most policies will require the attorney or Insured to report any claim, alleged error, or facts that could give rise to a malpractice complaint as soon as they learn of the mistake. An Insured's coverage only goes back as far as the prior acts retroactive date. If the attorney has had constant LPL coverage from day one, it is considered "Full Prior Acts". LPL are most often written in one year "policy period". Each policy period is its own contract so the coverages may change slightly from year to year. If an insurance company makes any significant changes, they're typically required to send a "fire watch" letter to their policyholders to explain the change. Insurance companies are either admitted or non-admitted to each state.

There are five important factors to consider when purchasing LPL coverage: 1) Premium, 2) Policy Limits and Deductible, 3) Coverages and Exclusions, 4) Defense Expenses, and 5) Company Organization.

- Premium

While the cost of the policy is obviously the primary factor for many law firms, careful examination is necessary to ensure that a lower premium does not correlate to less coverage. Insurance companies hire underwriters to evaluate each firm's risk based on the number of attorneys, number of staff, areas of practice, geographic regions, gross billed work, claim history, and other factors. Premiums may vary depending on the underwriter's risk appetite.

- Policy Limits and Deductible

The policy limit is how much the insurance company will spend to defend covered claims. Limits are written with the per occurrence limit first and then the aggregate limit per policy period. The per policy limit is how much the company will spend on each claim and the aggregate is the limit of how much will be spent per policy period across several claims. The limits are set and do not renew every policy period.

- Coverages and Exclusion

A typical coverage is for "Professional Services" "On behalf of Another". Professional Services means the work done as an attorney, which means that driving accidents on the way to a deposition or broken desk lamps are not covered. On behalf of another means the professional service is benefiting an outside party, which means that internal law firm employment issues or defending one's own DUI are not covered. Nearly all LPL policies exclude coverage for return of professional fees, which is when the client is asking for some or all of their money back. Meritless claims still need to be reported for coverage. Many attorneys believe that vexatious litigants will go away on their own but those claims can stretch out for years.

- Defense Expenses

First Dollar Defense and Defense Outside the Limits are two primary features of an LPL policy that should be looked at carefully. First Dollar Defense means that the insurance company will not apply the deductible to the defense costs. This allows the company to promptly investigate and address solvable issues. The Defense Outside the Limits refers to whether the defense costs come out of the limits or not.

- Company Organization

Most of the large insurance companies have an LPL policy but there are also several mutual companies. A mutual insurance company is owned by its policyholders. The company will take in premiums, pay settlements and verdicts, pay their operating costs, and then return the remainder in the form of a dividend. Many state bar associations have formed their own LPL Mutual insurance company.

=== Insurance agents, consultants, and brokers ===
use the term errors and omissions (E&O) insurance Other professions that commonly purchase professional liability insurance include accounting, engineering, land surveying and financial services, construction and maintenance (general contractors, plumbers, etc., many of whom are also surety bonded), and transport. Some charities and other nonprofits/NGOs are also professional-liability insured.

This type of insurance is in fact pretty common all over the world, being considered the main risk management instrument both for individuals and companies. The regulation in force, though, may vary and there can be significant differences between a country and another; in the European Union, despite the efforts at harmonizing the rules involved in this segment of the market, every country has its own framework legislation, resulting in a wide range of options. In the recent past countries like Italy adopted a number of dispositions that introduced an obligation for every category of self employed professionals to acquire this form of insurance; such obligation has become effective only with the definition of all the parameters. Finaccord, one of the leading international market research and consulting companies, has estimated that in the first 10 countries (Austria, Belgium, France, Germany, Italy, the Netherlands, Poland, Spain, Switzerland and the United Kingdom) the total value of this branch will rise from 6.15 billion US dollars in 2009 to 7.5 billion dollars by the end of 2017.

== Errors and omissions insurance ==
Errors and omissions (E&O) insurance, which may exclude negligent acts other than errors and omissions ("mistakes"), is most often used by consultants and brokers and agents of various sorts, including notaries public, real estate brokers, insurance agents themselves, appraisers, management consultants and information technology service providers (there are specific E&O policies for software developers, home inspectors, website developers, etc.), architects, landscape architects, engineers, land surveyors, attorneys, third-party business administrators, quality control specialists, nondestructive testing analysts, and many others. A mistake which causes financial harm to another can occur in almost any transaction in many professions.

=== Gaps in coverage ===
A gap in coverage, or lapse in coverage could result from not renewing the E&O coverage the same day it expires. Several carriers who underwrite policies will not allow professionals to backdate their coverage to their expiration date without a valid explanation (such as, but not limited to: natural disaster or personal medical issue that prevented one from renewing on time) and a signed warranty letter informing the carrier the specific professional is not aware of any pending claims. For example, with an effective date of 06/01/2010 and coverage expiring on 06/01/2011 and the insured does not renew the coverage on or before 06/01/2011 then the insured may have to enroll with a gap in coverage, resulting in a loss of prior acts coverage such that there is no coverage for any business placed prior to their new effective date. Although some carriers may allow a 30- to 45-day grace period, it is common for them to disallow this.

Gaps in coverage are common in E&O coverage. A modest survey suggested most professionals are unaware what a gap in coverage is or its harsh consequences. Several professionals incorrectly believed they did not need continuous coverage if they were not writing business during specific months.

A gap in coverage should not be confused with terminating or not renewing a policy due to retirement or death. In these cases, an extended reporting policy (ERP), may be purchased.

== Extended reporting policy (tail) coverage ==
"Tail" or "extended reporting" endorsements, known as run-off insurance or run-off cover in the UK, cover events that occur while the policy is in force but are reported to the carrier after the policy terminates. The availability of extended reporting policies depends on the carrier, the specific policy, and the reason for terminating business. Certain provisions will limit the professional from writing new business during the ERP, since only past policies are generally covered in an ERP or run-off policy, nothing current or new. Many claims-made policies contain provisions to offer an extended reporting period if the policy is non-renewed. The typical tail extends the reporting period only for claims up to six months or one year after the policy expiration date. An additional premium is charged when the extended reporting option is exercised.

"Prior acts" (or "nose") coverage transfers the retro-active date for an old policy to a new insurance carrier—eliminating the need to purchase tail coverage from the last carrier. Nose coverage is usually less expensive than purchasing tail coverage from the old carrier. Tail coverage costs 2–3 times the expiring premium.

== Civil liability insurance ==
Some policies go further than the standard coverage. Professional liability insurance coverage usually does not include defamation (libel and slander), breach of contract, breach of warranty, intellectual property, personal injury, security, and cost of contract. Coverage can often be added to provide indemnity "for any civil liability".

Because the operative clause of a civil liability policy is so wide, there is normally a long list of exclusions so that liabilities, like employers liability and public liability, that are the subject of other forms of insurance are not covered by the policy.
