= State Bar of New Mexico =

Bar Association

- Type: Legal Society
- Headquarters: Albuquerque, New Mexico
- Location: United States
- Members: 8,618 in 2012 (1,179 out of state)
- Website: http://www.nmbar.org/

The State Bar of New Mexico (SBNM) is the integrated (mandatory) bar association of the U.S. state of New Mexico.

== History ==
The State Bar of New Mexico first met on January 19, 1886, in Santa Fe, New Mexico, as a voluntary professional organization. There were 29 original members, and William A. Vincent was the first president.

In 1925, state statute caused the State Bar to operate as an agency of the New Mexico Supreme Court. In 1978, the State Bar of New Mexico (State Bar) was incorporated under the laws of the State of New Mexico.

== Structure ==
The SBNM is governed by a Board of Bar Commissioners, consisting of 19 members elected by district and one from each of the Senior Lawyer, Young Lawyer, and Paralegal Divisions.

SBNM enforces the rule that New Mexico lawyers must complete 12 credits of Continuing Legal Education each year.

SBNM publishes the weekly New Mexico Bar Bulletin and the quarterly New Mexico Lawyer.

In 1995, SBNM's Paralegal Division was established to serve the needs of New Mexico legal assistants.
