= Jeremiah Bitsui =

Native American actor from Arizona

- Born: 1979 or 1980 (age 45–46); Chinle, Arizona, U.S.
- Citizenship: Navajo Nation and U.S.
- Occupation: Actor
- Years active: 1994–present
- Children: 1

Jeremiah Bitsui (born 1979 or 1980) is an American actor, best known for his portrayal of Victor in the AMC series Breaking Bad and Better Call Saul, and for his voice role and motion capture performance as the character Eagle Flies in the 2018 Rockstar Games action-adventure Western video game Red Dead Redemption 2.

== Early and personal life ==
Bitsui was born in Chinle, Arizona. He is Navajo and of Omaha descent, and lived on the Navajo Nation Native American reservation until the age of ten. He later moved to Albuquerque, New Mexico, where he graduated from Albuquerque High School.

Bitsui has a daughter, Olivia. The character of Olivia Bitsui in Better Call Saul was named after his daughter. He is the co-founder of Youth Impacting Youth, a mentorship program which connects college students with youth who have experienced domestic violence.

== Career ==
Bitsui started his career at the age of five as Mickey in the Japanese film Mickey's House. He appeared in the 1994 film Natural Born Killers and the 2005 film A Thousand Roads, which was an official Sundance Film Festival selection. In addition to his best known role as Victor on both Breaking Bad and Better Call Saul, he is also well known for his portrayal of the pivotal supporting character Eagle Flies in the 2018 action-adventure video game Red Dead Redemption 2, as well as for his roles in the television series Bosch and Yellowstone.

== Filmography ==
=== Film ===
Year	Title	Role	Notes
1994	Natural Born Killers	Young Indian Boy	
2005	A Thousand Roads	Johnny Chee	
2005	Lords of Dogtown	Cholo	Uncredited
2006	Flags of our Fathers	Young Indian	
2009	High Society: A Pot Boiler	Yakob	
2009	Brothers	Cop	
2010	The Dry Land	Luis	
2011	The Reunion	Mexican Captain	
2013	Blaze You Out	Isaiah	
2014	After the Fall		
2014	Drunktown's Finest	Sickboy	
2021	The Pizza Tip	Officer Ford	
2023	Frybread Face and Me	Uncle Roger	

=== Television ===
Year	Title	Role	Notes
2005	Into the West	Sgt. Red Tomahawk	Episode: "Ghost Dance"
2005	Wildfire	Ricky Sanchez	Episode: "The Track"
2008	In Plain Sight	Alex	1 episode
2009–2011	Breaking Bad	Victor	8 episodes
2011	CSI: Miami	Luis Tafoya	Episode: "Killer Regrets"
2011	In Plain Sight	Gangbanger	1 episode
2014	The Night Shift	Sgt. Martin/Soldier	2 episodes
2014	Longmire	Chuck	1 episode
2015	The Life	Matt Gallecki	1 episode
2017–2022	Better Call Saul	Victor	14 episodes
2018	Yellowstone	Robert Long	Episode: "Day Break"
2018	Dreamcatcher Bios	Self	Episode: "Wes Studi: The Man Behind Magua"
2019–2020	Bosch	Officer Billy Harjo	3 episodes
2022	Dark Winds	James Tso/Hoski	Main role
2024	Chicago PD	Hector Lozano	2 episodes
2025	American Primeval	Grey Fox	3 episodes
2025	The American Revolution	Voice of Twethorechte and Stockbridge Petitioners	Ken Burns documentary series

=== Video games ===
Year	Title	Voice role	Notes
2018	Red Dead Redemption 2	Eagle Flies	Also motion capture
