= Tina Parker =

American actress

Tina Parker is an American actress known for her role of Francesca Liddy, Saul Goodman's assistant and secretary on Breaking Bad and Better Call Saul.

== Career ==
Parker currently serves as the Co-Artistic Director and administrative director at Kitchen Dog Theater. Active with the company since 1993, she has been directly involved, as an actor, director, or designer, with over 50 productions.

== Filmography ==
=== Film ===
Year	Title	Role	Notes
2000	Dr. T & the Women	Dr. T's Staff	
2003	Prison-A-Go-Go!	Breezy	
2008	Suitable for Murder	Nurse Unger	
2009	The Final Destination	Cheyenne	
2009	Leaves of Grass	Sharon	
2010	The Virginity Hit	Tina	
2010	Father of Invention	Steak	
2011	Wuss	Scary Biology Teacher	
2011	Trespass	Security Operator	
2012	Meeting Evil	Rhonda	
2013	The Lone Ranger	Helen	Uncredited
2014	Men, Women & Children	Allison's Mom	
2015	The Ridiculous 6	Mary Todd Lincoln	
2017	Walk of Fame	Heidi	
2018	The Tale	Fran	
2018	Puppet Master: The Littlest Reich	Betsy	
2018	1985	Cashier	
2018	The Middle of X	Vanessa Camply	
2019	To the Stars	Edith McCoy	
2020	The Pale Door		

=== Television ===
Year	Title	Role	Notes
2000–2001	Walker, Texas Ranger	Cashier/Receptionist	2 episodes
2006	The Year Without a Santa Claus	Artemis	TV movie
2009–2013	Breaking Bad	Francesca Liddy	Recurring
2010	Lone Star	Doreen	
2010	The Good Guys	Police Clerk	
2010	Memphis Beat	Sadie Boswell	
2010	Scoundrels	Roxy	
2011	Chase	Court Clerk	
2012	Dallas	Nurse	
2013	Longmire	Rosco Wilkes	
2014	Rectify	Karen	
2015	Salem	Overseer	
2017	One Mississippi	Nikki Burns	
2017–2022	Better Call Saul	Francesca Liddy	Recurring
2025	The Lowdown	Sandy Gardner	
