= Piñata (Better Call Saul) =

- Better Call Saul episode
- Episode no.: Season 4 Episode 6
- Directed by: Andrew Stanton
- Written by: Gennifer Hutchison
- Original air date: September 10, 2018
- Running time: 48 minutes

Guest appearances
- Michael McKean as Chuck McGill; Mark Margolis as Hector Salamanca; Lavell Crawford as Huell Babineaux; Kerry Condon as Stacey Ehrmantraut; Rainer Bock as Werner Ziegler; Dennis Boutsikaris as Rich Schweikart; Eileen Fogarty as Mrs. Nguyen; Ray Campbell as Tyrus Kitt; Tommy Nelson as Peewee; Carlin James as Scooter; Cory Chapman as Skippy; Ben Bela Böhm as Kai; Stefan Kapičić as Casper

Episode chronology
← Previous "Quite a Ride"	Next → "Something Stupid"
- Better Call Saul season 4

"Piñata" is the sixth episode of the fourth season of the AMC television series Better Call Saul, a spin-off series of Breaking Bad. The episode aired on September 10, 2018, on AMC in the United States. Outside of the United States, the episode premiered on streaming service Netflix in several countries.

== Plot ==
=== Opening ===
In a flashback to 1993, Jimmy McGill and Kim Wexler collect ballots for an Hamlin Hamlin & McGill office pool predicting the outcomes of the 65th Academy Awards, and Howard Hamlin announces that Chuck McGill has successfully closed a lucrative case. The staff applauds and Kim takes the opportunity to show Chuck her own legal acumen. Jimmy tries to congratulate Chuck, who is dismissive. Jimmy passes the firm's law library while delivering mail, checks to make sure no one is watching, and silently enters.

=== Main story ===
In 2003, late at night, Kim reviews Mesa Verde documents but is drawn to her pro bono cases. The next morning, she meets with Rich Schweikart and makes a successful pitch to join Schweikart & Cokely as head of a new banking division. She informs Jimmy over lunch, falsely telling him that Rich sought her out. Kim's news causes Jimmy to have a panic attack in the restaurant's kitchen; he then returns and encourages her to take the job.

A relative of Geraldine Strauss, Jimmy's first elder law client, (Note: As seen in "Alpine Shepherd Boy".) calls him and says that she died. Jimmy breaks down afterward, and later re-watches his first elder law commercial, (Note: As seen in "Amarillo".) which featured Geraldine.

Gus Fring and Mike Ehrmantraut arrange to house Werner Ziegler and his crew while they build the meth lab. Mike explains the living and security arrangements to Werner and his crew; one of the crew, Kai, appears dismissive, but Werner vouches for him. Mike apologizes to Stacey for exposing Henry at the support group, (Note: As seen in "Talk".) and Stacey allows him to see Kaylee again.

Gus visits a hospitalized, unconscious Hector Salamanca and recounts a childhood story about a coati that ate the fruit from a lúcuma tree Gus had carefully tended in Chile. He trapped the coati, which broke its leg while trying to escape. Rather than killing it, which would have been humane, Gus held it and let it suffer until it died.

Jimmy visits HHM to pick up his $5,000 inheritance check. (Note: As seen in "Breathe".) Howard explains that clients are leaving because HHM's reputation has been damaged by recent events. Before departing, Jimmy tries a "tough love" pep talk to rouse Howard into action.

Jimmy uses his inheritance to buy pay-as-you-go phones for resale on the street. The three teenagers who previously robbed him attempt to rob him again, (Note: As seen in "Quite a Ride".) and Jimmy springs a trap. After the three teenagers are bound and suspended upside down, Huell Babineaux and Man Mountain use bats to smash piñatas close to their heads. Jimmy obtains their fearful agreement that the boys will leave him alone and spread the word that he is off limits.

== Production ==
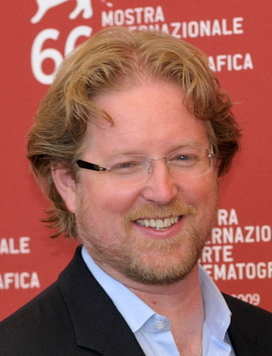
"Piñata" was Andrew Stanton's first directorial work for Better Call Saul.

This episode features the return of Michael McKean (Chuck McGill), who last appeared in the third-season finale when his character was killed off-screen after he deliberately set his house on fire in an apparent suicide.

This episode was directed by Andrew Stanton, who is better known for writing and directing several Pixar films, including Finding Nemo and WALL-E. Stanton also directed the live-action film John Carter. "Piñata" is Stanton's second television production, following two episodes of the second season of Stranger Things. Following his work on Stranger Things he spoke to people about opportunities in further television production. During one such conversation with Mark Johnson and Melissa Bernstein, the show's executive producers, they suggested he direct a Better Call Saul episode. Stanton jumped at the chance, as he was already a fan of both Breaking Bad and Better Call Saul and wanted the opportunity to work with both Vince Gilligan and Peter Gould.

The scene with Gus and Hector ends with a shot of Hector's right hand as Gus walks out. This was intended to allude to the scene in the Breaking Bad fourth season episode "Face Off," in which Hector uses the same hand to trigger the explosion that kills both him and Gus. Two takes of this scene were shot, one with Hector's finger twitching and one without, as there had been debate on the production team over which version would be better. The episode as broadcast did not include the twitch.

== Reception ==
"Piñata" received critical acclaim. On Rotten Tomatoes, it garnered a perfect 100% rating with an average score of 8.52/10 based on 11 reviews. The site's critical consensus is, "Though more of an expositional creep than previous episodes, 'Piñata' maintains the season's emotionally charged character growth and provides a powerful, mildly petrifying performance from Giancarlo Esposito."

Emmy nominee Giancarlo Esposito submitted this episode for consideration for the Primetime Emmy Award for Outstanding Supporting Actor in a Drama Series for the 71st Primetime Emmy Awards

=== Ratings ===
"Piñata" was watched by 1.40 million viewers on its first broadcast, earning a 0.4 ratings for viewers between 18 and 49.
