= Better Call Saul season 4 =

Fourth season of the AMC crime drama television series

Better Call Saul
- Season 4
- Home media cover art
- Showrunner: Peter Gould
- Starring: Bob Odenkirk; Jonathan Banks; Rhea Seehorn; Patrick Fabian; Michael Mando; Giancarlo Esposito
- No. of episodes: 10

Release
- Original network: AMC
- Original release: August 6 – October 8, 2018

Season chronology
- ← Previous; Season 3 Next → Season 5

The fourth season of the American television drama series Better Call Saul premiered on August 6, 2018, and concluded on October 8, 2018. The fourth season consists of 10 episodes and aired on Mondays at 9:00 pm (Eastern) in the United States on AMC. A spin-off prequel of Breaking Bad, Better Call Saul was created by Vince Gilligan and Peter Gould, both of whom also worked on Breaking Bad.

The first and second seasons mainly took place in 2002, with season three advancing the storyline to 2003. The fourth season also takes place mainly in 2003, with the last four episodes taking place in 2004 after a time jump in the seventh episode. In season four, Jimmy and Kim struggle to cope with Chuck's death. Howard believes that he is responsible for Chuck's death, and suffers with depression and disengagement from work. Mike begins security inspections at Madrigal, disregarding the fact that his consulting contract was supposed to be only a paper transaction. Gus is suspicious of Nacho after Hector's stroke. Nacho becomes a mole for Gus inside the Salamanca organization. Gus hires an engineer and construction crew to begin construction of the meth "superlab" under the industrial laundry. Lalo Salamanca arrives to begin running the family's drug business.

The fourth season of Better Call Saul received acclaim from critics and audiences, particularly for its pacing and character development, and six nominations for the 71st Primetime Emmy Awards, including Outstanding Drama Series.

== Production ==
AMC renewed Better Call Saul for a 10-episode fourth season in June 2017. The fourth season premiered in August 2018, and aired on Mondays at 9:00 pm (Eastern); the fourth season premiered later in the year than previous seasons, as both season 1 and 2 premiered in February 2015 and 2016, and season 3 premiered in April 2017. Screen Rant speculated that because the season was not confirmed until after the third season had finished airing, that the writers had a later start at writing, and the season did not begin filming until January 2018.

=== Filming ===
Better Call Saul is set and filmed in Albuquerque, New Mexico, the same location as its predecessor. Filming for the fourth season of Better Call Saul began in January 2018. The first episode was directed by Minkie Spiro. On May 30, 2018, screenwriter Thomas Schnauz confirmed in a tweet that production of the fourth season had finished.

In the first scene of the season, Jimmy is hiding his real identity under his Gene Takavic alias while working at a Cinnabon in a shopping mall in Omaha, Nebraska. The Cinnabon scenes in Better Call Saul are set in Omaha, but filmed at the Cottonwood Mall in Albuquerque, New Mexico.

Mark Margolis, who plays drug kingpin Hector Salamanca, required brain surgery after suffering severe head injuries in an accidental fall during filming.

The episode "Piñata" was directed by Andrew Stanton, who is better known for writing and directing several Pixar films, including Finding Nemo and WALL-E. During a conversation with Mark Johnson and Melissa Bernstein, the show's executive producers, he was given the suggestion that he accept an opportunity to direct a Better Call Saul episode, which he jumped at, as he had already been a fan of both Breaking Bad and Better Call Saul, and wanted the opportunity to work with the creators Vince Gilligan and Peter Gould.

=== Casting ===
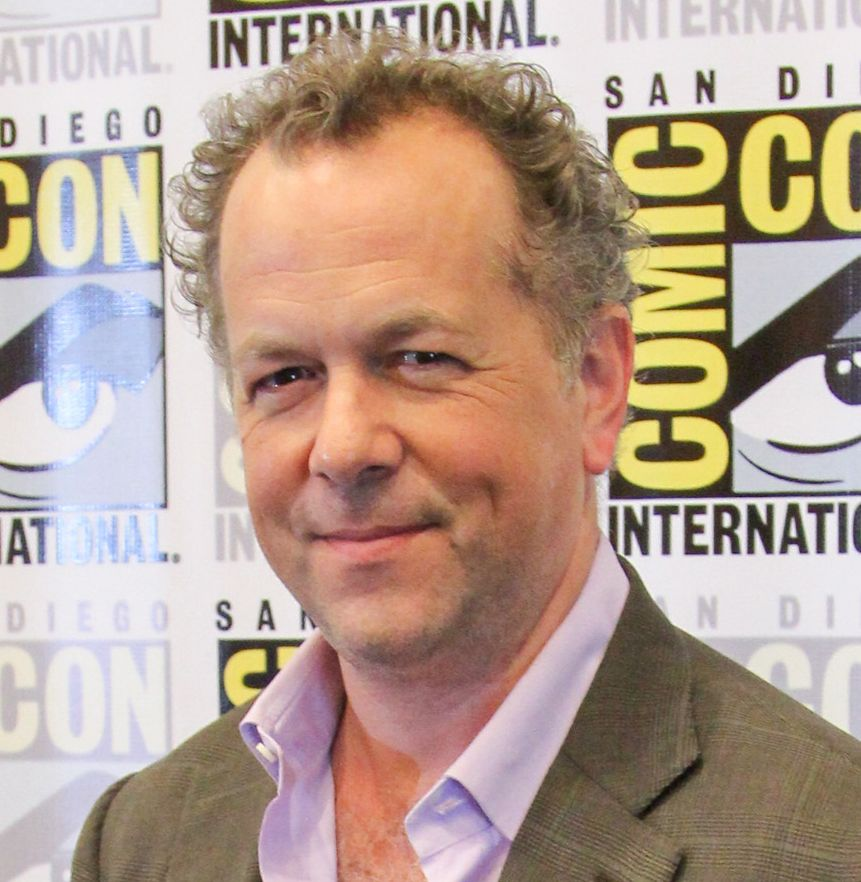
David Costabile (pictured), returns in the fourth season episode "Something Beautiful" to reprise his role as chemist Gale Boetticher.

Returning main cast members are Bob Odenkirk as Jimmy McGill, Jonathan Banks as Mike Ehrmantraut, Rhea Seehorn as Kim Wexler, Patrick Fabian as Howard Hamlin, Michael Mando as Nacho Varga, and Giancarlo Esposito as Gus Fring. Michael McKean (Chuck McGill), who was credited as a main cast member in previous seasons, does not return as a series regular following Chuck's death in the third season finale. In a June 2017 interview following the third-season finale, McKean commented on the possibility of returning to the series, stating "I know they want to bring me in for some flashbacks this coming season." McKean made a guest appearance in a flashback sequence at the beginning of the sixth episode, "Piñata", and again in the season finale, "Winner".

In May 2018, it was reported that Stefan Kapičić would have a recurring role in the fourth season. Kapičić stated, "I'm thrilled that I have a chance to become a part of Better Call Saul family. It is one of my favorite shows on TV and it's a dream come true be a part of the Breaking Bad universe." Lalo Salamanca, portrayed by Tony Dalton, is introduced in the eighth episode of the season. The character was first mentioned in the Breaking Bad episode "Better Call Saul".

The episode "Something Beautiful" marks the first Better Call Saul appearance of Gale Boetticher, a supporting character from Breaking Bad played by David Costabile. Costabile had been in Albuquerque filming Dig while Better Call Saul's team was wrapping up production of the first season. He met with Gould, and they agreed to have Gale appear on Better Call Saul. Costabile was able to work in filming for Better Call Saul between filming on Billions, but had only about a week to memorize both his dialogue and the lyrics to Tom Lehrer's "The Elements" which he had to sing karaoke-style in his scenes. This short period contrasted with his past singing performances on Breaking Bad, when he had more time to learn the lyrics.

== Plot ==
The death of Jimmy's brother Chuck serves as a catalyst for his further transformation into Saul Goodman, and Jimmy's entrance into the criminal world puts a strain on his relationship with Kim and his future as a lawyer. Chuck's death also deeply affects Kim and Howard. Mike becomes a contracted security consultant for Madrigal. Nacho's attempted murder of Hector Salamanca causes Hector's stroke and disability, and affects the operations of Don Eladio's drug cartel and Gus Fring's plot to take it over.

Gilligan said in January 2018 that Better Call Saul "gets darker this season," and Odenkirk said that the fourth season would go to "another level."

== Cast and characters ==
=== Main ===
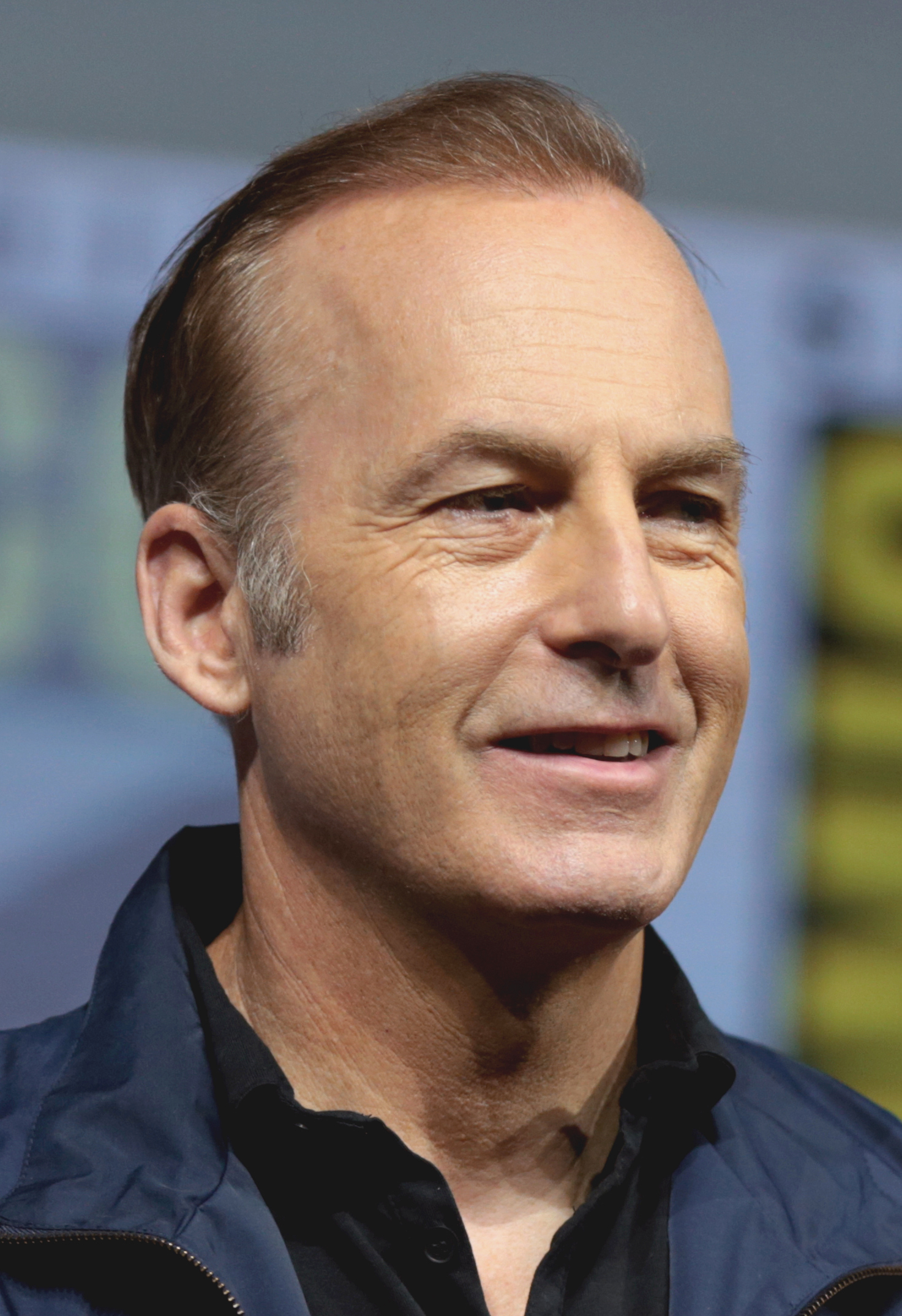
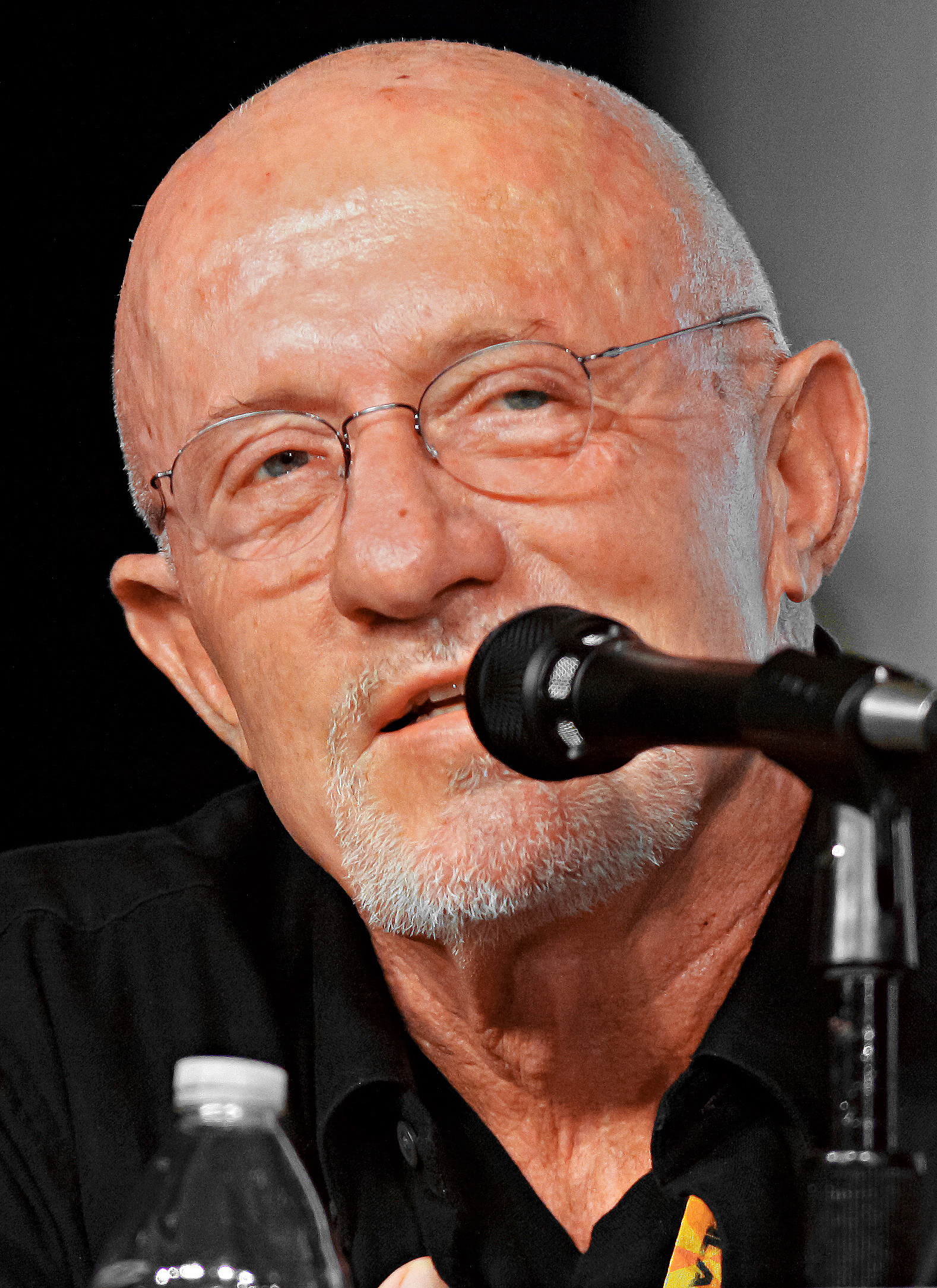
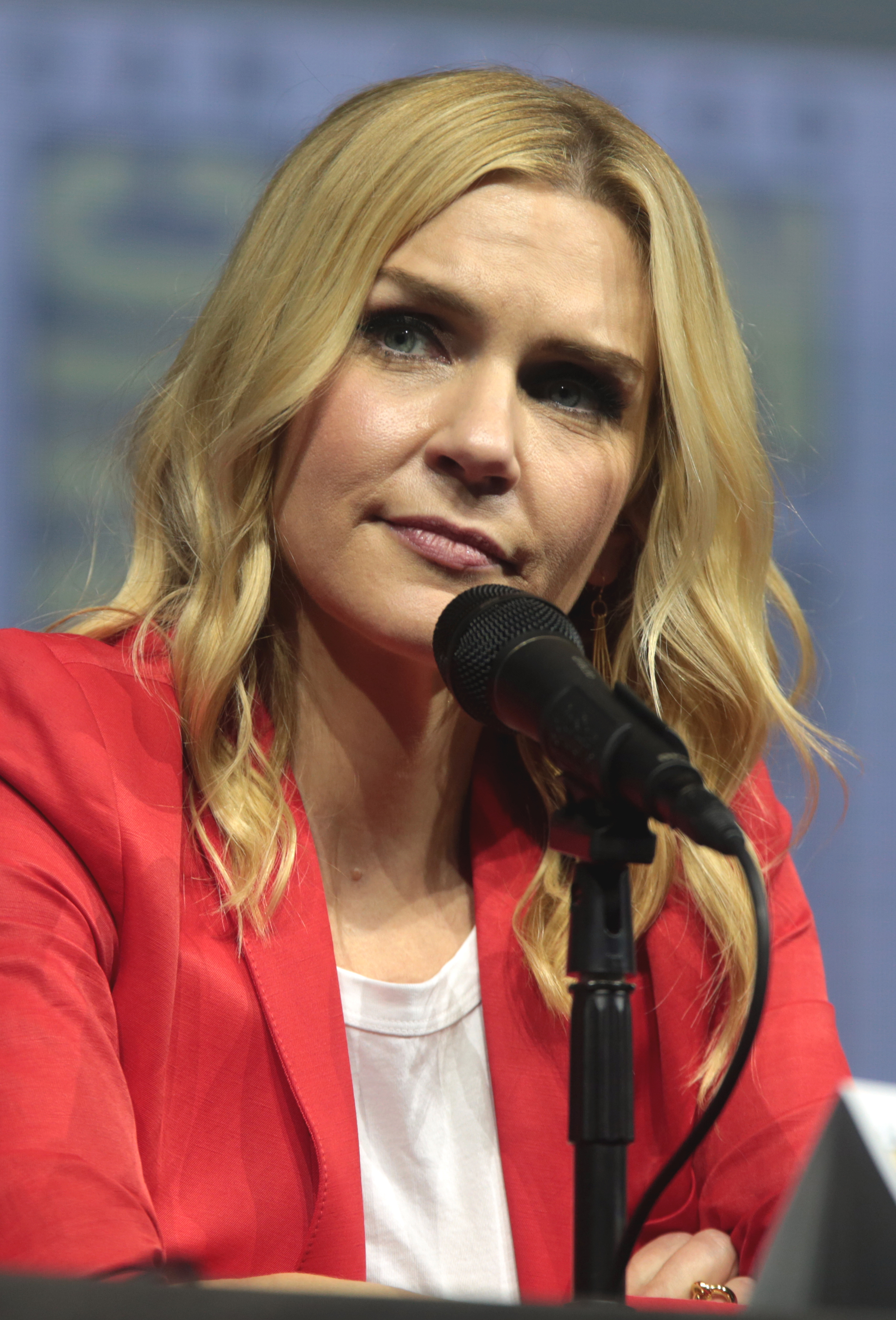
Bob Odenkirk (Jimmy McGill), Jonathan Banks (Mike Ehrmantraut), and Rhea Seehorn (Kim Wexler)
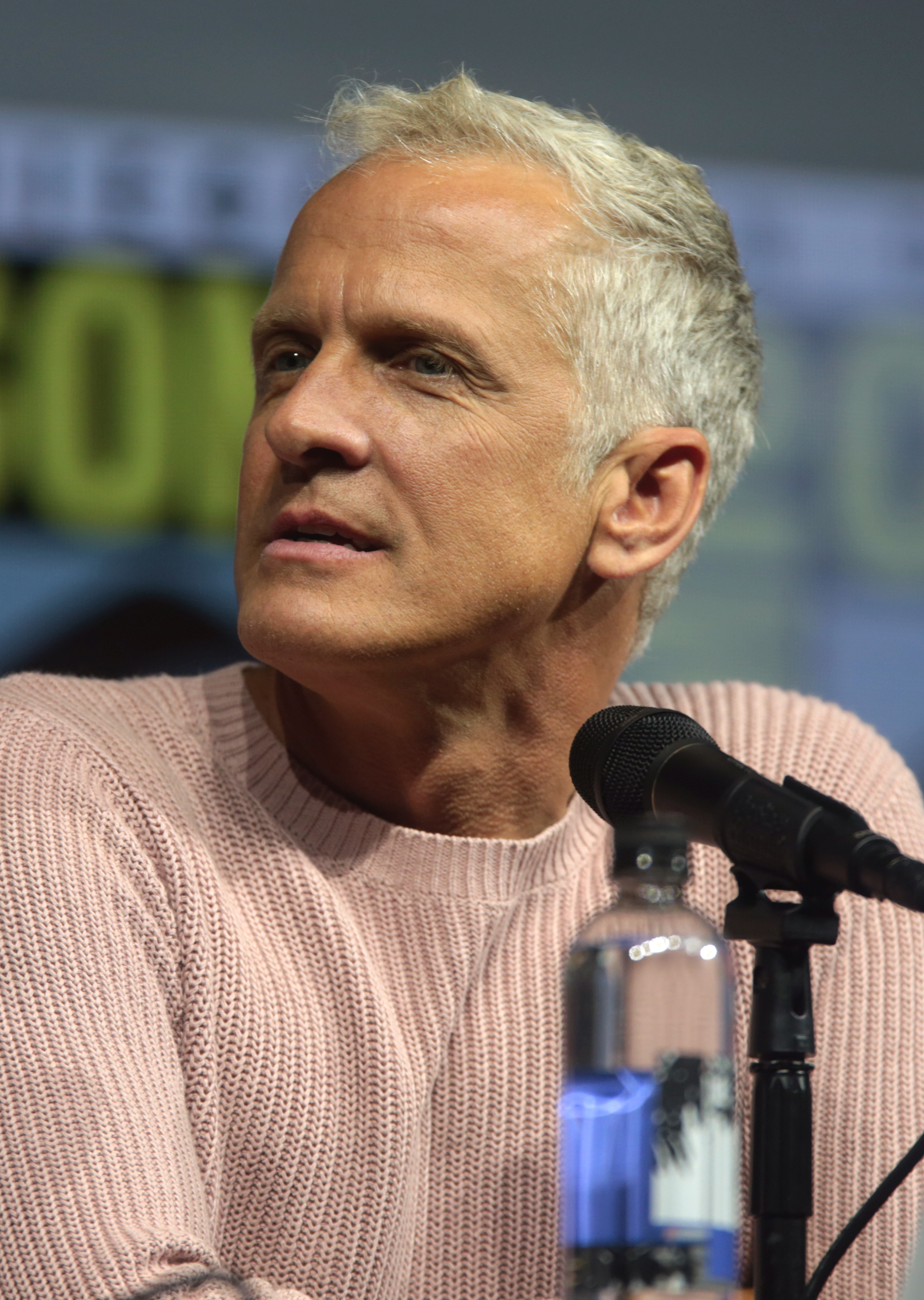
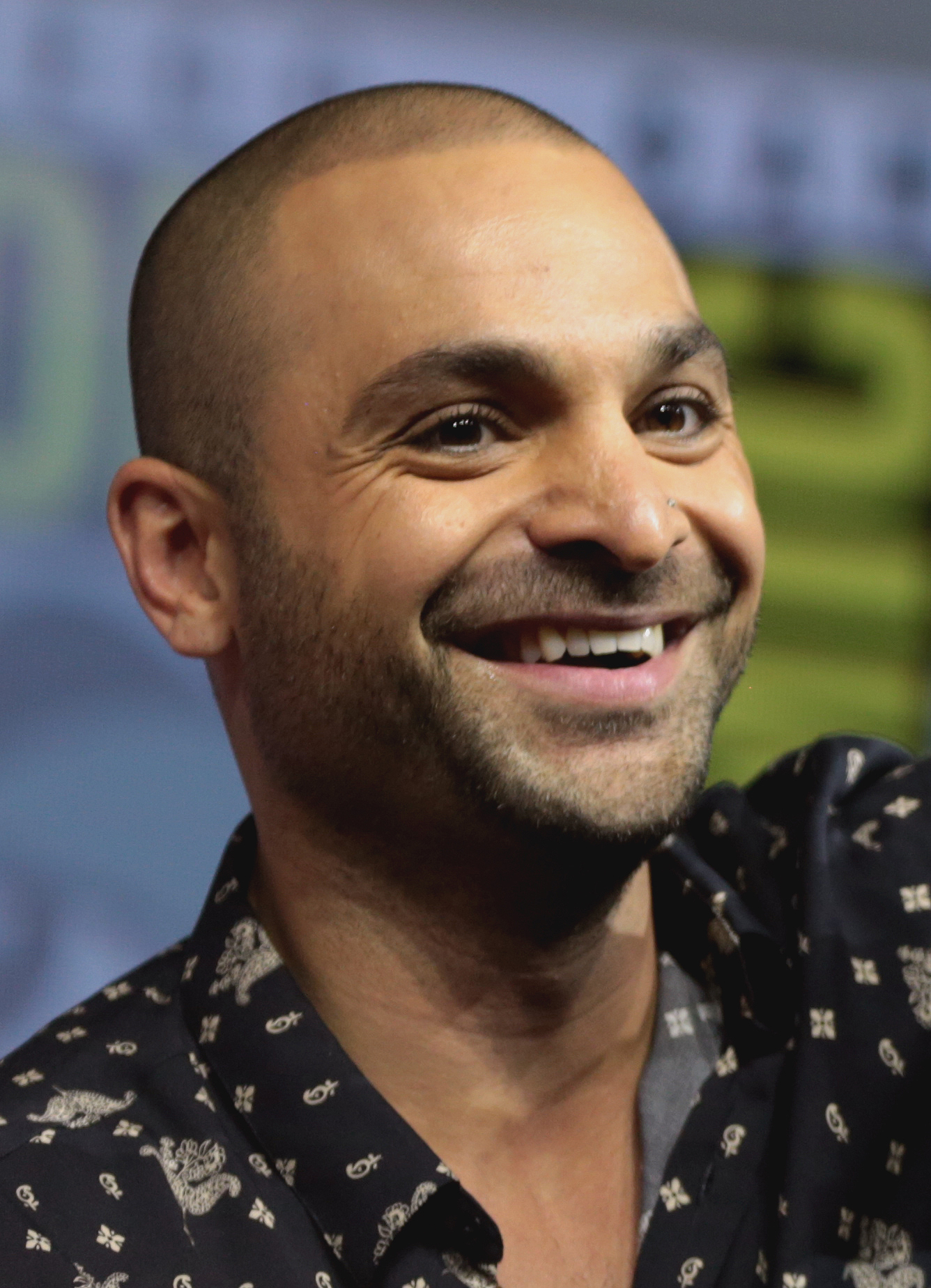
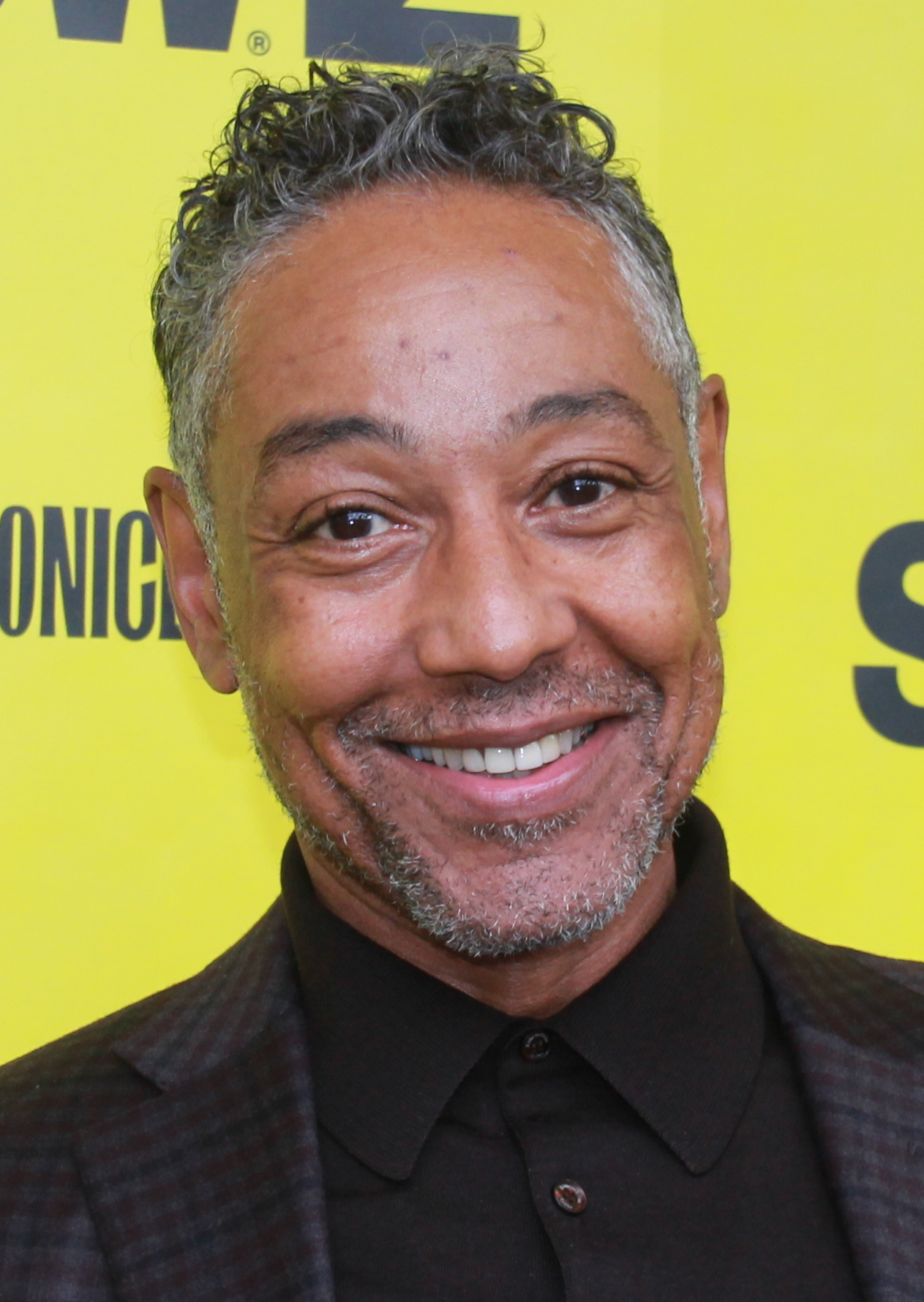
Patrick Fabian (Howard Hamlin), Michael Mando (Nacho Varga), and Giancarlo Esposito (Gus Fring)
- Bob Odenkirk as Jimmy McGill / Saul Goodman, suspended New Mexico attorney, turned cell phone sales manager, moonlighting in prepaid phone sales to criminals. In the present, he manages a Cinnabon store in Omaha under the alias Gene Takavic.
- Jonathan Banks as Mike Ehrmantraut, Madrigal corporate security consultant, gradually becoming a "fixer" for Gus Fring's criminal ambitions.
- Rhea Seehorn as Kim Wexler, now primarily a corporate banking lawyer with a moral passion for public defense cases, Jimmy's girlfriend and legal confidant.
- Patrick Fabian as Howard Hamlin, sole managing partner of the now flailing Hamlin, Hamlin & McGill, executor of Chuck's estate, suffering from insomnia and depression.
- Michael Mando as Nacho Varga, a lieutenant in Don Eladio's Mexican cartel, now overseeing daily operations in Albuquerque; torn between the vicious Salamanca enforcers and Gus Fring's ambitions for complete takeover and secession from Eladio, co-opted by Fring after trying to kill Hector Salamanca.
- Giancarlo Esposito as Gus Fring, a Chilean national, now Albuquerque cocaine distributor in Don Eladio's cartel, using his fried chicken chain, Los Pollos Hermanos, as a legitimate front.

=== Recurring ===
- Mark Margolis as Hector Salamanca, the patriarch of a brutal family of drug enforcers in Don Eladio's Mexican cartel, incapacitated via a stroke at the end of season three.
- Kerry Condon as Stacey Ehrmantraut, Mike's widowed daughter-in-law and the mother of Kaylee Ehrmantraut
- Jeremiah Bitsui as Victor, Gus' henchman.
- Vincent Fuentes as Arturo, a criminal associate of Nacho Varga and Hector Salamanca.
- Ann Cusack as Rebecca Bois, Chuck's ex-wife.
- Dennis Boutsikaris as Rich Schweikart, the attorney for Sandpiper Crossing in the class action lawsuit Jimmy develops.
- Andrew Friedman as Mr. Neff, manager of Neff Copiers.
- Poorna Jagannathan as Dr. Maureen Bruckner, Johns Hopkins stroke-recovery specialist, funded by Gus Fring's grant to oversee Hector's treatment.
- Daniel Moncada and Luis Moncada as Leonel and Marco Salamanca, Hector's nephews, Tuco's cousins, brutal hitmen for the Eladio cartel.
- Javier Grajeda as Juan Bolsa, Eladio cartel under boss
- Ray Campbell as Tyrus Kitt, a henchman on Gus Fring's payroll.
- Juan Carlos Cantu as Manuel Varga, Nacho's father, owner of an upholstery shop.
- Abigail Zoe Lewis as Kaylee Ehrmantraut, Mike's granddaughter.
- Rex Linn as Kevin Wachtell, the CEO of Mesa Verde Bank, now Kim's only client.
- Cara Pifko as Paige Novick, the senior counsel of Mesa Verde Bank and Trust.
- Franc Ross as Ira, a burglar with whom Jimmy conspires, and the owner of Vamonos Pest.
- Keiko Agena as Viola Goto, Kim's paralegal.
- Tommy Nelson as Rocco, the leader of the thugs who mug Jimmy at House of Dogs.
- Carlin James as Zane, a thug who mugs Jimmy.
- Cory Chapman as Jed, a thug who mugs Jimmy.
- Eileen Fogarty as Mrs. Nguyen, owner of a nail salon and Jimmy's landlord.
- David Costabile as Gale Boetticher, an idealistic college chemistry student on scholarship.
- Rainer Bock as Werner Ziegler, a German engineer hired by Gus to plan and oversee the construction of his underground meth "superlab"
- Stefan Kapičić as Casper, a member of Werner Ziegler's team for the construction of Gus's meth "superlab"
- Ben Bela Böhm as Kai, a member of Werner Ziegler's construction team, who Mike holds in contempt
- Lavell Crawford as Huell Babineaux, a professional pickpocket hired by Jimmy for security.
- Michael McKean as Chuck McGill, who appears in flashbacks, Jimmy's deceased elder brother and a founding partner of HHM. Chuck committed suicide at the end of the third season.
- Josh Fadem as Camera Guy, a UNM film student, helps Jimmy on various endeavors.
- Hayley Holmes as Drama Girl, UNM film student who helps Jimmy on various projects and schemes.
- Julian Bonfiglio as Sound Guy, UNM film student who helps Jimmy.
- Tony Dalton as Lalo Salamanca, acting head of the Salamanca family of drug dealers, part of Don Eladio's cartel.
- Ethan Phillips as Benedict Munsinger, a judge.

=== Guest stars ===
- Ed Begley Jr. as Clifford Main, founding partner of Davis & Main, Jimmy's former employer in the second season.
- Don Harvey as Jeff, a cab driver Gene encounters.
- Laura Fraser as Lydia Rodarte-Quayle, a Madrigal Electromotive executive and associate of Gus Fring.
- JB Blanc as Barry Goodman, Gus Fring's medical counsel.
- Joe DeRosa as Dr. Caldera, a veterinarian who serves as Mike and Jimmy's liaison to the criminal underworld.
- Tamara Tunie as Anita, a member of Mike's widower's support group.
- Tina Parker as Francesca Liddy, Jimmy's receptionist.
- Peter Diseth as Bill Oakley, a deputy district attorney.
- Max Arciniega as Krazy-8 Molina, a cocaine distributor working for Nacho and the Salamanca family.
- Brandon K. Hampton as Ernesto, Chuck's paralegal/assistant, appears in a flashback.

== Episodes ==
Better Call Saul season 4 episodes
| No. overall | No. in season | Title | Directed by | Written by | Original release date | U.S. viewers (millions) |
|---|---|---|---|---|---|---|
| 31 | 1 | "Smoke" | Minkie Spiro | Peter Gould | August 6, 2018 | 1.77 |
In a flash forward, following his collapse while working at the Omaha Cinnabon, "Gene" has a worrying encounter with a hospital clerk who needs his personal information for billing purposes. During his taxi ride back to the mall, Gene becomes suspicious of the driver, when he spots an Albuquerque Isotopes air freshener; he exits before reaching the mall and walks around the corner out of the driver's sight. In 2003, Jimmy and Kim learn of Chuck's death, and believing himself responsible, Jimmy falls into depression. Howard arranges Chuck's funeral, and later admits that he believes his decision to dismiss Chuck from HHM caused Chuck's suicide. Howard explains that Chuck's malpractice insurance rates had become exorbitant – not realizing Jimmy was to blame for reporting Chuck's instability to the insurers; Jimmy allows Howard to take the blame and quickly regains his happy-go-lucky demeanor. Meanwhile, Mike decides to perform actual security and safety consulting for Madrigal Electromotive and details a list of violations he uncovered on his first site visit. Following Hector's stroke, the cartel bosses direct Nacho and Arturo to take over Hector's drug operation. Gus remains suspicious of Nacho and has Victor follow him, spotting him disposing of the dud pills.
| 32 | 2 | "Breathe" | Michelle MacLaren | Thomas Schnauz | August 13, 2018 | 1.55 |
With his law license suspended, Jimmy interviews for a job as a salesman at Neff Copiers and spots an opportunity to steal a valuable Hummel figurine. Rebecca and Kim meet with Howard to review the disposition of Chuck's estate. Unaware of Jimmy's role in the events, Kim has an explosive confrontation with Howard in which she lambastes him for treating Jimmy poorly ever since. Meanwhile, Lydia informs Mike that his security consulting is meant to be a paper transaction to facilitate the laundering of the money he stole from the Salamancas, but Mike insists on continuing actual inspections, arguing they provide a plausible explanation in case anyone looks into the payments. Gus discreetly pays a skilled doctor to help Hector recover from his stroke. When Nacho and Arturo come to his facility to acquire more drugs, Arturo strong-arms his way into taking more than he is supposed to. He brags about his success as they leave, but Gus ambushes and kills him. Gus reveals that he knows Nacho attempted to murder Hector, but the Salamancas do not, so Nacho is now under Gus' control.
| 33 | 3 | "Something Beautiful" | Daniel Sackheim | Gordon Smith | August 20, 2018 | 1.51 |
Jimmy approaches Mike to steal the Hummel, but he is unwilling to do it, so Jimmy hires Ira. The crime is nearly a bust due to the unexpected development of the owner living at the Copiers, but they manage to escape with the figure. Kim returns to working with Mesa Verde but is concerned about their planned rapid expansion. Victor and Tyrus arrange Arturo's death to look like a gang attack, deflecting attention from Nacho and hiding his involvement with Gus. The staged attack includes bullet wounds for Nacho, who calls Leonel and Marco (the Cousins) for aid. They succeed in getting Nacho to Dr. Caldera alive; he covertly saves Nacho but recommends Nacho seek proper care to ensure there are no complications. The Cousins alert the cartel that the attack looks like the one carried out previously on one of their trucks (the one Mike attacked secretly). Concerned that their Mexican routes are vulnerable, Juan Bolsa directs Gus to seek local manufacturers. Gus visits the university to check on the quality of meth samples he gave to Gale Boetticher for testing. Kim tells Jimmy about the disposition of Chuck's will, giving him a letter purportedly from Chuck, which is undated but contains condescending praise for Jimmy. Jimmy calls it "nice", but Kim is visibly upset by it.
| 34 | 4 | "Talk" | John Shiban | Heather Marion | August 27, 2018 | 1.53 |
Jimmy is quickly bored with managing a cellular phone store and tries to boost business. He later meets with Ira, who sold the stolen Hummel for more than expected and offers to carry out future thefts. Bored herself with Mesa Verde work, Kim observes Judge Munsinger's courtroom, hoping to rekindle her interest in the law by taking on pro bono defense counsel work. Meanwhile, Victor sells the drugs from the fake attack on Nacho to the Espinosas. Nacho tells the Salamancas that the Espinosas carried out the attack, so the Cousins kill the Espinosas, retrieve the "stolen" drugs, and return to Mexico. Nacho realizes that by eliminating the Espinosas, Gus secured himself more territory, but does not see the full scope of Gus' plan. Mike confronts Henry in their support group for falsely claiming to have a wife who died. Later, he inspects another Madrigal site and provides a list of items to fix. He meets with Gus, who feigns anger that Mike did not tell him about Nacho's intent to kill Hector, but Mike says he promised only not to kill Hector himself. He realizes Gus' ulterior motive and tells him to provide information about "the job" he wants done.
| 35 | 5 | "Quite a Ride" | Michael Morris | Ann Cherkis | September 3, 2018 | 1.53 |
In a flash forward (taking place during Breaking Bad's "Ozymandias"), Francesca quickly shreds documents and Saul frantically collects cash, mementos, and paperwork from his office before contacting his "disappearer" for a new identity. In 2003, Jimmy convinces a customer to buy several prepaid cellular phones as a way to maintain his privacy and then gets the idea to profit by reselling prepaid phones on the street. He sells them all, but the venture proves unsuccessful because he is mugged by three teenagers. As Kim treats his wounds, he blames himself for not recognizing the threat and promises to see a psychologist, but instead goes to work the next day as usual. Kim is assigned as pro bono counsel for several defendants. When a problem arises with recent Mesa Verde paperwork, Kim sees her current case through to completion before responding, for which Paige later reprimands her. Meanwhile, Mike discreetly escorts foreign structural engineers through the industrial laundry so they can evaluate the space below as a site for Gus' planned meth "superlab". Gus is impressed by one, Werner Ziegler, and offers him the job of planning and overseeing the construction of the facility.
| 36 | 6 | "Piñata" | Andrew Stanton | Gennifer Hutchison | September 10, 2018 | 1.40 |
In a flashback, Kim and Jimmy work in HHM's mailroom. Third-year law student Kim demonstrates her legal knowledge, impressing pre-sickness Chuck and piquing Jimmy's curiosity. In 2003, Kim juggles Mesa Verde work with pro bono criminal defense cases, and Jimmy struggles financially during his suspension. Kim joins Schweikart & Cokely, enabling her to handle both Mesa Verde and criminal cases, but disappointing Jimmy, who realizes the death of his dream to restart the Wexler-McGill office. Jimmy is informed that Geraldine, his first eldercare client, has died, and he grieves for her more than for Chuck. Jimmy tries to rouse a depressed Howard with a "tough love" speech. He uses his $5,000 inheritance to buy prepaid cell phones for street resale. This time, Jimmy intimidates his three teenage assailants into leaving him alone. Meanwhile, Mike creates secret living and recreation facilities for Werner's crew, who begin constructing Gus' meth "superlab". Gus visits a hospitalized, unconscious Hector and previews their future by relating a childhood story about trapping a coati that ate the fruit from a lúcuma tree Gus nursed to health. Rather than humanely killing the injured coati after catching it, Gus held it and let it suffer until it died.
| 37 | 7 | "Something Stupid" | Deborah Chow | Alison Tatlock | September 17, 2018 | 1.35 |
In a time jump sequence of several months that advances to early 2004, Jimmy and Kim are shown to be drifting further apart. Kim's arm has healed, and to Jimmy's chagrin, she thrives at Schweikart & Cokely, with Mesa Verde's expansion continuing on schedule and Kim finding time to work on the pro bono criminal defense cases that give her satisfaction. Jimmy plans his return to practicing law, including searching for an office. His business re-selling prepaid phones on the street continues to grow, and he increasingly uses his "Saul Goodman" alias. Huell is arrested for assaulting a police officer who tries to get Jimmy to end his phone business, and Jimmy involves Kim in defending him. He tries to get her to smear the police officer so the charges will be dropped, but she refuses, telling Jimmy she has a better way. Meanwhile, Hector begins recovering from his stroke, so Gus dismisses Dr. Bruckner, in effect trapping Hector's recovered mind in his unhealed body. Mike observes Werner's crew during construction of the underground meth lab; work proceeds more slowly than expected, frustrating the crew, and Mike has to step in to break up a fight.
| 38 | 8 | "Coushatta" | Jim McKay | Gordon Smith | September 24, 2018 | 1.37 |
Kim enlists S&C employees in Huell's defense and indicates she'll bury prosecutor Suzanne Ericsen in paperwork. Jimmy takes a bus ride, uses a variety of pens and paper to write supportive mail for Huell, and enlists other passengers to help. The mail is sent with return addresses and postmarks from Coushatta, Louisiana, Huell's hometown. Suzanne investigates, but Jimmy has arranged for a fake church website and pay-as-you-go cellular phones that Jimmy and his TV ad film crew answer. The phony support causes Suzanne to accept a plea that keeps Huell out of jail. Kim is elated, and tells Jimmy she wants to engage in similar behavior again. Meanwhile, Mike arranges a strip club outing for Werner and his crew. Kai starts a fight, but the real problem is Werner, who drunkenly discusses underground concrete construction details with strangers. A fully healed Nacho takes prominence in the Salamanca organization and trains Domingo to punish dealers who do not meet their weekly quota. However, he is then surprised by the unexpected arrival of Lalo Salamanca, who unlike Hector, is interested in the everyday details of the business, which concerns Nacho. At home, Nacho keeps a safe with cash and fake Canadian IDs for himself and his father.
| 39 | 9 | "Wiedersehen" | Vince Gilligan | Gennifer Hutchison | October 1, 2018 | 1.35 |
Jimmy and Kim surreptitiously replace approved plans for Mesa Verde's Lubbock, Texas branch with plans for a bigger building. Jimmy answers the questions eloquently at his reinstatement hearing, but his application is denied. The chairman suggests Jimmy's answers were "insincere", and when he recounts the details to Kim, she explains to Jimmy that he did not mention Chuck; Jimmy's relationship with Chuck caused his suspension, so the panel expected Jimmy to discuss it. He defensively accuses Kim of "slumming" with him whenever she needs something, while Kim says she is always supportive and Jimmy causes his own problems. That night, Jimmy starts moving out, but Kim stops him and offers to help him win reinstatement. Meanwhile, Lalo visits Hector and improves his communication ability with a concierge bell Lalo kept as a souvenir after Hector killed a hotelier and burned the building. Lalo thanks Gus for saving Hector's life and paying for his treatment. He then asks Nacho to show him where the Salamancas receive their drugs after Gus' trucks bring them from Mexico. Later, Werner's crew blow up the rock preventing construction of the elevator and celebrates that their work is almost done. Werner misses his wife and in desperation, escapes.
| 40 | 10 | "Winner" | Adam Bernstein | Peter Gould & Thomas Schnauz | October 8, 2018 | 1.53 |
In a flashback, Chuck feigns enthusiasm on the day Jimmy becomes an attorney. In 2004, Kim helps Jimmy's appeal by arranging public displays where he feigns grief for Chuck. Jimmy participates in interviewing Chuck's scholarship candidates and connects with one whose past includes shoplifting. He tells her the other panel members didn't select her and counsels her that the powerful will never look past her youthful mistake, so she should do whatever is necessary to get ahead. At his appeal, Jimmy speaks extemporaneously about how he wants to bring credit to the McGill name. His appeal succeeds, but he reveals to Kim that it was a con, and his declaration that he will not practice under his own name stuns her. Meanwhile, Lalo surveils Gus' drug operation and learns about its regular activities. Werner plans a rendezvous with his wife, with Mike obtains in hot pursuit, learning of his location from a money wire clerk. Lalo finds Mike's actions suspicious so investigates himself, killing the clerk. Lalo tricks Werner into revealing lab construction details over the phone before Mike ends the call. Under Gus' orders, Mike reluctantly agrees to kill Werner, so Werner calls his wife at the airport and sends her home, after which Mike shoots him. Gus shows Gale the still-in-progress lab.

== Release ==
=== International broadcast ===
Outside the U.S. in certain international markets, season 4 was released on Netflix with episodes available the day after the episodes were broadcast on AMC.

=== Home media ===
The fourth season was released on Blu-ray and DVD in region 1 on May 7, 2019. The set contains all 10 episodes, plus audio commentaries for every episode and several behind-the-scenes featurettes.

== Reception ==
=== Critical response ===
Better Call Saul season 4: Critical reception by episode
Season 4 (2018): Percentage of positive critics' reviews tracked by the website Rotten Tomatoes

The fourth season, much like the previous three, received critical acclaim, particularly for its pacing and character development. On Metacritic, the season has a score of 87 out of 100 based on 16 critics. On Rotten Tomatoes, the season has a 99% approval rating with an average score of 8.9 out of 10 based on 185 reviews. The site's critical consensus states, "Well-crafted and compelling as ever, Better Call Saul deftly balances the show it was and the one it will inevitably become."

Based on the first three episodes, Liz Shannon Miller of IndieWire gave the series a highly positive review with an "A" grade. She wrote that season four is "better, deeper, and more daring" and that it is "one of the most subtle and brilliant shows on TV." Spencer Kornhaber of The Atlantic said of the season premiere: "Old dynamics flip, long-gestating character studies pay off, and feelings geyser up in surprising places." Following the season finale, Judy Berman of Time wrote, "In showing us one individual's preordained moral downfall, Better Call Saul spent Season 4 demonstrating how a hypocritical criminal justice system can ensnare a whole class of people for life". Chris Evangelista of /Film wrote after the finale: "Better Call Saul remains one of the best shows on TV right now. Not only did Jimmy change this season, he changed those around him – and for the worst."

Lalo Salamanca, portrayed by Tony Dalton, is introduced as a recurring character in this season, Alan Sepinwall of Rolling Stone said Dalton "makes a solid first impression in the role, so hopefully this will turn out to be more than filling in a blank most viewers had long since forgotten existed."

==== Critics' top ten list ====
2018
- No. 1 NPR (Fresh Air)
- No. 3 CinemaBlend (Nick Venable)
- No. 3 Film School Rejects
- No. 3 Vulture (Matt Zoller Seitz)
- No. 4 RogerEbert.com
- No. 4 TV Guide
- No. 5 Adweek
- No. 5 Thrillist
- No. 6 Rolling Stone
- No. 6 WhatCulture
- No. 7 Consequence
- No. 7 Entertainment Weekly (Kirsten Baldwin)
- No. 7 Uproxx
- No. 8 Decider
- No. 8 The Ringer
- No. 9 The Hollywood Reporter (Tim Goodman)
- No. 9 Vulture (Jen Chaney)
- No. 10 The Hollywood Reporter (Daniel Fienberg)
- No. 10 IndieWire
- – CNN

=== Ratings ===
Viewership and ratings per episode of Better Call Saul season 4
| No. | Title | Air date | Rating (18–49) | Viewers (millions) | DVR (18–49) | DVR viewers (millions) | Total (18–49) | Total viewers (millions) |
|---|---|---|---|---|---|---|---|---|
| 1 | "Smoke" | August 6, 2018 | 0.6 | 1.77 | 0.5 | 1.41 | 1.1 | 3.18 (Note: Live +7 ratings were not available, so Live +3 ratings have been used instead.) |
| 2 | "Breathe" | August 13, 2018 | 0.4 | 1.55 | 0.7 | 1.77 | 1.1 | 3.32 |
| 3 | "Something Beautiful" | August 20, 2018 | 0.4 | 1.51 | 0.5 | 1.35 | 0.9 | 2.86 |
| 4 | "Talk" | August 27, 2018 | 0.4 | 1.53 | 0.7 | 1.99 | 1.1 | 3.52 |
| 5 | "Quite a Ride" | September 3, 2018 | 0.4 | 1.53 | 0.7 | 1.87 | 1.1 | 3.40 |
| 6 | "Piñata" | September 10, 2018 | 0.4 | 1.40 | 0.7 | 1.98 | 1.1 | 3.38 |
| 7 | "Something Stupid" | September 17, 2018 | 0.4 | 1.35 | 0.5 | 1.44 | 0.9 | 2.79 |
| 8 | "Coushatta" | September 24, 2018 | 0.5 | 1.37 | 0.4 | 1.42 | 0.9 | 2.79 |
| 9 | "Wiedersehen" | October 1, 2018 | 0.5 | 1.35 | 0.5 | 1.74 | 1.0 | 3.10 |
| 10 | "Winner" | October 8, 2018 | 0.5 | 1.53 | 0.6 | 1.71 | 1.1 | 3.24 |

== Accolades ==
In 2018, Better Call Saul was named one of the top 10 television programs of the year by the American Film Institute. The series won the award for Outstanding Achievement in Drama at the 35th TCA Awards.

For the 71st Primetime Emmy Awards, the series received six nominations–for Outstanding Drama Series, Odenkirk for Outstanding Lead Actor in a Drama Series, Banks and Esposito each for Outstanding Supporting Actor in a Drama Series, McKean for Outstanding Guest Actor in a Drama Series, and Schnauz and Gould for Outstanding Writing for a Drama Series for the episode "Winner".

| Ceremony | Category | Recipients | Result | Ref. |
|---|---|---|---|---|
| 35th TCA Awards | Outstanding Achievement in Drama | Better Call Saul | Won | |
| 71st Primetime Emmy Awards | Outstanding Drama Series | Better Call Saul | Nominated | |
| 71st Primetime Emmy Awards | Outstanding Lead Actor in a Drama Series | Bob Odenkirk | Nominated | |
| 71st Primetime Emmy Awards | Outstanding Supporting Actor in a Drama Series | Jonathan Banks | Nominated | |
| 71st Primetime Emmy Awards | Outstanding Supporting Actor in a Drama Series | Giancarlo Esposito | Nominated | |
| 71st Primetime Emmy Awards | Outstanding Writing for a Drama Series | Thomas Schnauz and Peter Gould (for "Winner") | Nominated | |
| 71st Primetime Creative Arts Emmy Awards | Outstanding Guest Actor in a Drama Series | Michael McKean | Nominated | |
| 71st Primetime Creative Arts Emmy Awards | Outstanding Music Supervision | Thomas Golubić (for "Something Stupid") | Nominated | |
| 71st Primetime Creative Arts Emmy Awards | Outstanding Sound Editing for a Comedy or Drama Series | Kurt Nicholas Forshager, Kathryn Madsen, Mark Cookson, Matt Temple, Jane Boegel-Koch, Jason Newman, Jeff Cranford, and Gregg Barbanell (for "Talk") | Nominated | |
| 71st Primetime Creative Arts Emmy Awards | Outstanding Sound Mixing for a Comedy or Drama Series | Larry Benjamin, Kevin Valentine, and Phillip W. Palmer (for "Talk") | Nominated | |
| 23rd Satellite Awards | Best Actor – Television Series Drama | Bob Odenkirk | Nominated | |
| 24th Critics' Choice Awards | Best Drama Series | Better Call Saul | Nominated | |
| 24th Critics' Choice Awards | Best Actor in a Drama Series | Bob Odenkirk | Nominated | |
| 24th Critics' Choice Awards | Best Supporting Actress in a Drama Series | Rhea Seehorn | Nominated | |
| American Film Institute Awards 2018 | Television Programs of the Year | Better Call Saul | Won | |
| 71st Writers Guild of America Awards | Drama Series | Better Call Saul | Nominated | |
| 25th Screen Actors Guild Awards | Outstanding Performance by an Ensemble in a Drama Series | Jonathan Banks, Rainer Bock, Ray Campbell, Giancarlo Esposito, Michael Mando, Bob Odenkirk, and Rhea Seehorn | Nominated | |
| 30th Producers Guild of America Awards | Best Episodic Drama | Vince Gilligan, Peter Gould, Mark Johnson, Melissa Bernstein, Thomas Schnauz, Gennifer Hutchison, Nina Jack, Diane Mercer, Gordon Smith, Alison Tatlock, Ann Cherkis, Bob Odenkirk, and Robin Sweet | Nominated | |
| 45th Saturn Awards | Best Action-Thriller Television Series | Better Call Saul | Won | |
| 45th Saturn Awards | Best Supporting Actor on Television | Jonathan Banks | Nominated | |
| 45th Saturn Awards | Best Supporting Actress on Television | Rhea Seehorn | Nominated | |
| 45th Saturn Awards | Best Guest Starring Role on Television | Rainer Bock | Nominated | |

== Related media ==
=== Madrigal Electromotive Security Training ===
Similar to the series of fictional employee training videos used during season three, AMC posted ten mini-episodes of Madrigal Electromotive Security Training to YouTube and its social media accounts during the run of season four. The videos feature a mix of live-action footage of Banks portraying Mike in providing training to new security employees of Madrigal and animated segments. Jonathan Banks and the series were initially nominated for the Primetime Emmy Award for Outstanding Actor in a Short Form Comedy or Drama Series and Primetime Emmy Award for Outstanding Short Form Comedy or Drama Series, respectively, but the nominations were pulled by the Academy of Television Arts & Sciences after they discovered the episodes were shorter than the category's required runtime, stating "This decision is in no way a diminishment of the quality of Better Call Saul Employee Training or Mr. Banks' performance in it".
