= Cobbler (Better Call Saul) =

- Better Call Saul episode
- Episode no.: Season 2 Episode 2
- Directed by: Terry McDonough
- Written by: Gennifer Hutchison
- Original air date: February 22, 2016
- Running time: 47 minutes

Guest appearances
- Ed Begley Jr. as Clifford Main; Mark Proksch as Daniel "Pryce" Wormald; Jessie Ennis as Erin Brill; Omar Maskati as Omar; Eileen Fogarty as Mrs. Nguyen; Juan Carlos Cantu as Manuel Varga; A. Russell Andrews as Detective Salerno; Troy Winbush as Detective Salerno's partner; John Christian Love as Ernesto

Episode chronology
| ← Previous "Switch" | Next → "Amarillo" |
- Better Call Saul season 2

"Cobbler" is the second episode of the second season of the AMC television series Better Call Saul, a spin-off series of Breaking Bad. The episode aired on February 22, 2016, on AMC in the United States. Outside of the United States, the episode premiered on streaming service Netflix in several countries.

== Plot ==
=== Opening ===
Howard Hamlin arrives to deliver groceries as Chuck McGill plays Gabriel Fauré's Sicilienne on his home piano. Chuck says he is apprehensive about Jimmy McGill joining Davis & Main, which Howard says happened mostly through Kim Wexler's efforts. After Howard leaves, Chuck turns on his metronome and stares at it silently.

=== Main story ===
Before a meeting between Hamlin, Hamlin & McGill, and Davis & Main, Kim rearranges name placards so that she and Jimmy sit side by side. On a break, she gives him a travel mug that originally read "World's Best Lawyer", which she altered to "World's 2nd Best Lawyer". At the nail salon Jimmy receives his new Mercedes-Benz company car, but is frustrated that his mug does not fit in the cup holder like it did in his old car.

At the courthouse, Mike Ehrmantraut sees Daniel Wormald arrive. He tells Mike about the burglary at his house (Note: As depicted in "Switch".) and Mike cautions about talking to the police, but Daniel is adamant about getting his baseball cards back. To prevent Daniel from meeting with the police, Mike offers to find the cards. Nacho Varga refuses to return them so Mike threatens to inform Tuco Salamanca about Nacho's secret drug deals. They agree that Daniel will trade his Hummer to Nacho for the baseball cards and $10,000.

Chuck sits in during an HHM–D&M meeting. Jimmy is hesitant to discuss Sandpiper client outreach in front of him, but continues after silent encouragement from Kim. Mike asks him to represent Daniel when he meets with the police. Daniel tells the detectives his baseball cards were returned so there is no need for further investigation, but they are skeptical. Jimmy talks to them privately and fabricates a story about a failed gay love affair and the stealing of the baseball cards as revenge. To provide an explanation for Daniel's hiding place, Jimmy claims it contained videos of Daniel sitting on various types of pies, a fictitious fetish called "Hoboken squat cobbler". The detectives believe him, but Jimmy later tells Daniel that they need to film an actual video to show the police.

That night, Jimmy tells Kim about Daniel's case. Kim is amused at first, but becomes appalled when Jimmy reveals that the video was fabricated. She asks him why he would threaten his legal career by committing a crime for a pro bono case. Jimmy counters by asking why she was willing to play along with tricking Ken, but she replies that con had nothing to do with work. She then tells Jimmy that she never wants hear about him committing such acts again, and Jimmy agrees that she will not hear of them.

== Production ==
Bob Odenkirk was said to have inspired the name of the episode and the fetish portrayed in the police interrogation room scene. Peter Gould said "There weren't as many names. In fact, I don't know that we named it at all. I think (Jimmy) just said, 'He sits in pies.' He pitched the idea: 'Sex acts all have a name. Shouldn't there be a name for this thing?'"

"On this show, he mostly is a performer, but every once in a while, you see that he really is one of the great comic minds of our time. That was an example of Bob giving us a direction that we ran with, and then he ran with it in performance. And I just love it. I have to say, that was an interesting evolution of that scene. I'm really proud of it."

== Reception ==
=== Ratings ===
Upon airing, the episode received 2.23 million American viewers, and an 18-49 rating of 1.0.

Including DVR playback, the episode was watched by 4.373 million viewers and attained an 18-49 rating of 2.0.

=== Critical reception ===
The episode received critical acclaim from critics, with much of the praise going to Bob Odenkirk's performance, Jimmy McGill's character development, and the police interrogation room scene. Terri Schwartz of IGN gave the episode an 8.8 rating, noting that the episode "made excellent use of Bob Odenkirk's humor, delivering some of the funniest moments of the series". The Telegraph noted how "amid the chuckles were intimations of darker days ahead".

Donna Bowman of The A.V. Club gave the episode an A− rating, comparing the police scene to the bar scene from the previous episode, saying

It’s the criminal defense equivalent of the Viktor-with-a-K con from the premiere, a web of pure fabrication that plays right into the police’s jaded worldview: People are sick; anything’s possible; it’s almost too crazy not to be real. But to seal the deal, Jimmy buys some baked goods and films Daniel sitting on them. It’s not clear he needed to do this to convince the police. Rather, as he’s gleefully recounting the scam to Kim, it seems that he takes some pleasure in humiliating the idiotic dipshit. In doing so, though, he crosses a line—he fabricates evidence. Kim’s horrified, but for Jimmy, it’s a way of being both Slippin’ Jimmy and James M. McGill, Esq. He’s keeping it isolated from Davis & Main, he assures her; strictly pro bono work. He’s trying to have the cocobolo desk and flip the forbidden switch at the same time.

Nicholas Parco of The New York Daily News said of the police scene and the episode as a whole that "Sure, McGill [...] is nowhere near the Goodman that Breaking Bad fans fell in love with, but in the final scene of the aptly titled “Cobbler,” the evolution shines through more than ever. Alan Sepinwall of HitFix called the scene "the funniest Breaking Bad universe moment since Jesse thought Walt was going to build a robot, and the show sending a reassuring message that it will do just fine whenever the switch in Jimmy's office flips permanently to the Saul position." David Segal of The New York Times called the scene "my favorite scene of this very young season. I particularly loved the notion that as convincing as Jimmy was, the cops apparently ended the interview less than fully persuaded that a lover’s spat, and the aforementioned fetish, explained the home robbery of Daniel Wormald, the world’s most irritating naïf."

Jonathan Banks's role as Mike was received positively by critics as well. Sean T. Collins of The New York Observer said "Mike’s material is strong even by his own standards. His dynamic with Daniel Wormald [...] is exasperatingly entertaining enough to come with the Curb Your Enthusiasm soundtrack. [...] And it’s worth pointing out that in deciding to help reclaim the cards only after Dan reveals some of them belonged to his dad, we catch a glimpse of the tragic father-and-son backstory we learned about Mike in Season One’s strongest episode."
