= Smoke (Better Call Saul) =

- Better Call Saul episode
- Episode no.: Season 4 Episode 1
- Directed by: Minkie Spiro
- Written by: Peter Gould
- Editing by: Skip Macdonald
- Original air date: August 6, 2018
- Running time: 46 minutes

Guest appearances
- Ed Begley Jr. as Clifford Main; Javier Grajeda as Juan Bolsa; Kerry Condon as Stacey Ehrmantraut; Ann Cusack as Rebecca Bois; Dennis Boutsikaris as Rick Schweikart; Jordan Lage as Barry Hedberg; Jeremiah Bitsui as Victor; Vincent Fuentes as Arturo Colon; Ericka Kreutz as The Hospital Receptionist; Don Harvey as The Taxi Driver; Brendan Jennings as A Madrigal Employee; Bechir Sylvain as A Madrigal Employee; Abigail Zoe Lewis as Kaylee Ehrmantraut; Mark Margolis as Hector Salamanca

Episode chronology
← Previous "Lantern"	Next → "Breathe"
- Better Call Saul season 4

"Smoke" is the fourth season premiere of the AMC television series Better Call Saul, a spin-off series of Breaking Bad. The episode aired on August 6, 2018, on AMC in the United States. Outside of the United States, the episode premiered on streaming service Netflix in several countries.

== Plot ==
=== Opening ===
In a flashforward, "Gene Takavic" has collapsed at the Omaha Cinnabon and is raced to the hospital, but is discharged after doctors confirm he did not suffer a heart attack. (Note: As seen in "Mabel".) As Gene leaves, the receptionist stops him to obtain billing information. She has difficulty processing Gene's identification, making him apprehensive, but she quickly realizes she made a mistake and corrects her error. Gene takes a taxi to the mall, where his car is parked, but becomes uneasy when he sees the driver making eye contact and he recognizes an Albuquerque Isotopes air freshener on the rearview mirror. He asks to be let out before reaching the mall, then walks quickly around the corner and out of the driver's sight.

=== Main story ===
Howard Hamlin calls Jimmy McGill and Kim Wexler about the fire at Chuck McGill's, (Note: As seen in "Lantern".) and they arrive as Chuck's body is taken away. Jimmy sees the appliances outside Chuck's home and surmises his electromagnetic hypersensitivity symptoms had returned. He falls into a deep depression from which Kim tries to help him recover. Howard takes on the responsibility of arranging Chuck's funeral.

Mike Ehrmantraut receives his first payment from Madrigal Electromotive as a contracted security consultant, which Gus Fring arranged to launder the money Mike stole from the Salamancas. (Note: As seen in "Fall".) Though it was meant to be a no-show job, Mike enters a Madrigal facility, performs a detailed inspection, and turns the results over to the manager with instructions to let Lydia Rodarte-Quayle know he was there.

Following Mike's advice, (Note: As seen in "Expenses".) after Hector Salamanca's stroke Nacho Varga takes the fake capsules containing ibuprofen from Hector and replaces them with Hector's real nitroglycerin. He tries to dispose of the fakes but is interrupted by Gus, who says they need to meet with Juan Bolsa. Juan puts Nacho and Arturo in charge of the Salamanca operation for the time being. Afterward, Nacho drives to a bridge and throws the fakes away, unaware Victor has followed him.

Several of Chuck's friends and associates attend his funeral and give Jimmy their condolences. After the service, Howard tells Jimmy and Kim he has realized Chuck committed suicide and fears that he was responsible, because he forced Chuck out of HHM after their malpractice insurance premium increased. Instead of admitting to his role in causing the increase, Jimmy affirms Howard's guilt and immediately regains his happy-go-lucky demeanor.

== Production ==
In the opening scene, Saul is at his workplace, a Cinnabon mall store. Though set in Omaha, Nebraska, the flash-forward was filmed at the Cottonwood Mall in Albuquerque, New Mexico. The episode marks the first appearance of Jeff, played by Don Harvey, though he is not named until the fifth season premiere.

== Reception ==
"Smoke" received critical acclaim from critics. On Rotten Tomatoes, it garnered a perfect 100% rating with an average score of 8.76/10 based on 17 reviews. The site consensus reads, "'Smoke' kicks off Better Call Saul's fourth season by finally shifting Jimmy's disturbing transition to Saul into full gear." Matt Fowler of IGN gave "Smoke" a positive review, with an 8.3/10.0 rating writing, "It's a heavy, reflective chapter that readily relies on silence to create both suspense and sorrow."

=== Ratings ===
"Smoke" was watched by 1.77 million viewers in the United States on its original air date, fewer than the third-season finale which brought in 1.85 million American viewers.
