= Something Beautiful (Better Call Saul) =

- Better Call Saul episode
- Episode no.: Season 4 Episode 3
- Directed by: Daniel Sackheim
- Written by: Gordon Smith
- Editing by: Skip Macdonald
- Original air date: August 20, 2018
- Running time: 43 minutes

Guest appearances
- Javier Grajeda as Juan Bolsa; Rex Linn as Kevin Wachtell; Cara Pifko as Paige Novick; Franc Ross as Ira; Keiko Agena as Viola Goto; Joe DeRosa as Caldera; Daniel and Luis Moncada as Marco and Leonel Salamanca; Ray Campbell as Tyrus; Jeremiah Bitsui as Victor; Andrew Friedman as Mr. Neff; Vincent Fuentes as Arturo; David Costabile as Gale Boetticher

Episode chronology
← Previous "Breathe"	Next → "Talk"
- Better Call Saul season 4

"Something Beautiful" is the third episode of the fourth season of the AMC television series Better Call Saul, a spin-off series of Breaking Bad. The episode aired on August 20, 2018, on AMC in the United States. Outside of the United States, the episode premiered on streaming service Netflix in several countries.

== Plot ==
Nacho Varga aids Victor and Tyrus Kitt in making it appear that Nacho's car was attacked and the drugs he and Arturo Colon picked up at Los Pollos Hermanos (Note: As seen in "Breathe".) were stolen. Victor and Tyrus riddle the car and Arturo's body with bullets. Victor shoots Nacho in the shoulder as agreed, then shoots him in the stomach, to make it "look real." Nacho calls the Cousins, who burn the car and take Nacho to veterinarian Dr. Caldera, who succeeds in saving Nacho's life.

Juan Bolsa tells Gus Fring that because drug and cash shipments have been disrupted several times, Gus should begin investigating the feasibility of finding a drug supplier within the United States rather than relying on cocaine from Mexico, unaware this is what Gus intended. Gus visits Gale Boetticher, a post-graduate student and researcher at the University of New Mexico, who reports on the poor quality of a meth sample Gus asked him to evaluate. Gale says he could produce a higher quality product, but Gus assures him he is destined for better things.

Jimmy McGill asks Mike Ehrmantraut to steal a valuable Hummel figurine from Neff Copiers and replace it with an inexpensive one that looks similar. Mike refuses, so Jimmy turns to Dr. Caldera, who puts him in touch with Ira. Ira agrees, but during the theft, he finds one of the owners sleeping in the office because of an argument with his wife. Ira calls Jimmy, who creates a distraction that enables Ira to leave with the Hummel.

Kim Wexler returns to work on the Mesa Verde account. Bank president Kevin Wachtell shows her plans for the bank's aggressive expansion. Concerned about the rate of growth, and increasingly bored with banking law, Kim gives more of the work to her paralegal, Viola Goto, and asks to be dropped off at the courthouse.

The next morning, Kim gives Jimmy Chuck McGill's letter. Kim offers to leave him to read it alone, but says she wants to stay after Jimmy suggests it. The letter is undated but appears to have been written when Jimmy worked in HHM's mailroom. On the surface the letter is full of praise, but it is slightly condescending and contains backhanded compliments. Jimmy does not respond emotionally and calls it "nice", but Kim begins crying and runs off to their bedroom.

== Production ==
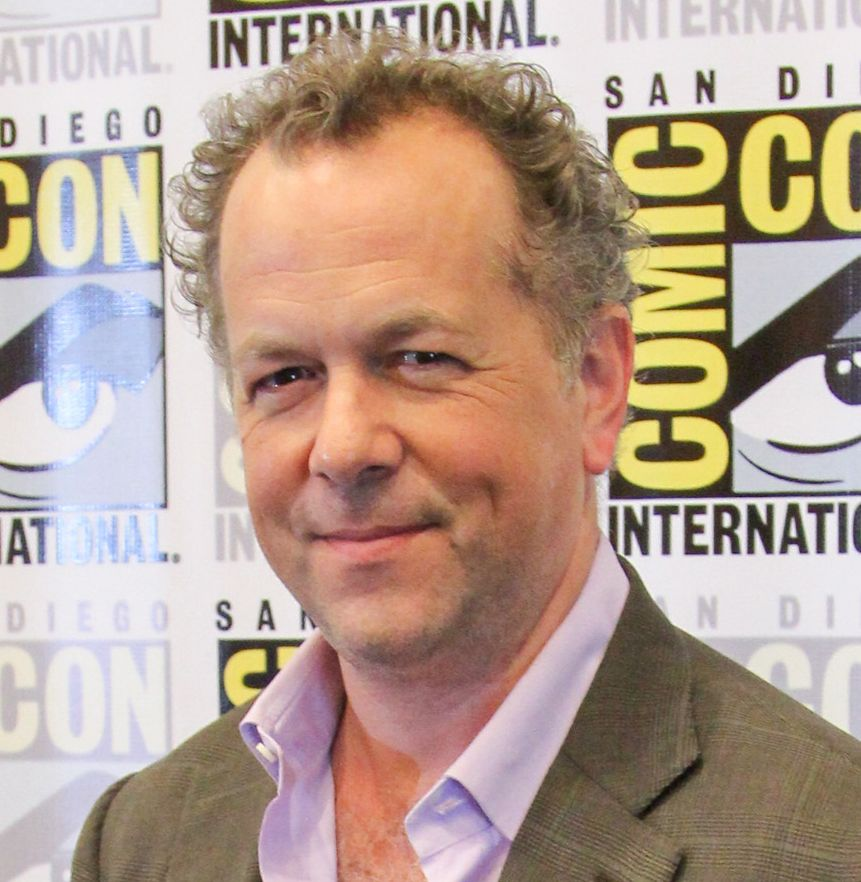
"Something Beautiful" is the first Better Call Saul episode for Breaking Bad character Gale Boetticher, portrayed by David Costabile (pictured).

This episode includes the first appearance of Gale Boetticher, a major character from Breaking Bad's third season played by David Costabile, into Better Call Saul. Costabile had been in Albuquerque filming Dig while Better Call Saul's team was wrapping up production of the final episode of the first season. He ran into co-producer Peter Gould and had a meal with him, during which they agreed that it would be great to have Gale appear on Better Call Saul. Costabile had not thought about it until he was contacted by the show's team, asking if he was ready to come back as Gale. Costabile was able to work in filming for Better Call Saul between filming on Billions. Costabile had only about a week with the script to memorize both his lines and to be able to sing karaoke to Tom Lehrer's "The Elements", in contrast to his past singing performances on Breaking Bad where he had more time to learn the lyrics. His filming for the episode, done within a day, was between shooting shots for Billions, requiring him to keep his beard he had grown for the role in Billions; Costabile considered this part of developing the background of the Gale character.

== Reception ==
"Something Beautiful" received critical acclaim. On Rotten Tomatoes, it garnered a perfect 100% rating with an average score of 9/10 based on 18 reviews. The site consensus reads, "'Something Beautiful' is full of strong, small moments that continue to drive the show's complicated characters forward – if ever so slowly."

=== Ratings ===
"Something Beautiful" was watched by 1.51 million viewers in the United States on its original air date.
