= Breathe (Better Call Saul) =

- Better Call Saul episode
- Episode no.: Season 4 Episode 2
- Directed by: Michelle MacLaren
- Written by: Thomas Schnauz
- Original air date: August 13, 2018
- Running time: 46 minutes

Guest appearances
- Mark Margolis as Hector Salamanca; Laura Fraser as Lydia Rodarte-Quayle; Ann Cusack as Rebecca Bois; JB Blanc as Dr. Barry Goodman; Poorna Jagannathan as Dr. Maureen Bruckner; Daniel and Luis Moncada as Leonel and Marco Salamanca; Ray Campbell as Tyrus Kitt; Jeremiah Bitsui as Victor; Juan Carlos Cantu as Manuel Varga; Vincent Fuentes as Arturo; Andrew Friedman as Mr. Neff; Michael Naughton as Seymour; Abigail Zoe Lewis as Kaylee Ehrmantraut

Episode chronology
← Previous "Smoke"	Next → "Something Beautiful"
- Better Call Saul season 4

"Breathe" is the second episode of the fourth season of the AMC television series Better Call Saul, a spin-off series of Breaking Bad. The episode aired on August 13, 2018, on AMC in the United States. Outside of the United States, the episode premiered on streaming service Netflix in several countries.

== Plot ==
Jimmy McGill looks for a job while serving the suspension of his law license. He interviews for a sales position at Neff Copiers and notices a collection of Hummel figurines in their office. The owners are apprehensive about his recent exit from the law and say they will get back to him after interviewing other candidates. He starts to leave but turns back and makes an aggressive case to be hired on the spot. The owners are impressed and offer him the job, but Jimmy refuses, contemptuous at how easily they were convinced with no due diligence.

Lydia Rodarte-Quayle meets with Mike Ehrmantraut to discuss his recent security audit, reminding him that his contracted consulting work for Madrigal was only meant to be a no-show job to launder the money he stole. Mike says the audits provide a plausible cover story if anyone questions the payments. When Lydia complains to Gus Fring, he tacitly approves of Mike's actions.

Howard Hamlin meets with Kim Wexler and Rebecca Bois to discuss Chuck McGill's estate. The bequests include a sealed letter from Chuck and $5,000 for Jimmy, which Kim recognizes as a tactic that prevents Jimmy from challenging the will. After Rebecca leaves, Kim furiously accuses Howard of treating Jimmy poorly to ease his own guilt about Chuck's death. That evening, Kim holds off on giving the documents to Jimmy. Suspecting from his previous knowledge (Note: As seen in "Alpine Shepherd Boy".) that one of the copier company's Hummels is worth thousands of dollars, Jimmy searches online to confirm his hunch, then calls Mike.

Gus learns that Hector Salamanca is no longer comatose and arranges for Dr. Bruckner, a skilled physician from Johns Hopkins, to oversee his recovery. She speaks fluent Spanish and explains Hector's course of treatment to Leonel and Marco Salamanca. Tyrus Kitt brings Gus a copy of Hector's medical file, and Gus confirms his suspicion that Nacho Varga tried to kill Hector.

Nacho and Arturo arrive at the Los Pollos Hermanos chicken farm to pick up their share of the next drug shipment. Arturo strongarms Gus' men for an extra kilo as he saw Nacho do on a previous occasion. (Note: As seen in "Off Brand".) As they leave, Arturo brags about his success, but Gus ambushes them and suffocates Arturo with a plastic bag. He then blackmails Nacho, revealing that he knows Nacho tried to kill Hector but has not told the Salamancas.

== Production ==
The episode's centerpiece, Kim's confrontation with Howard over how he has treated Jimmy in the wake of Chuck's death, was written by the series' executive producer Thomas Schnauz. The writers considered how both Howard and Kim had been reacting to Jimmy, with Howard feeling guilt for ousting Chuck from HHM and believing it led to Chuck's suicide, and Kim aware that something was causing Jimmy to feel emotionally hurt, but neither aware of Jimmy's role in Chuck's ouster. This led the writers to consider the situation between the characters from Kim's point of view, rather than Jimmy's. When coupled with Howard's past treatment of Kim, they believed the interplay between Howard and Kim would result in a powerfully emotional scene.

One scene in "Breathe" shows Mike watching his granddaughter Kaylee on a playground swing. This shot was added as an Easter egg, as it is similar to a scene in the Breaking Bad episode "Say My Name", which was Mike's final appearance. In "Say My Name", Mike is watching Kaylee swing in a park when he learns that the DEA is about to arrest him, and he is forced to flee without saying goodbye. Both "Say My Name" and "Breathe" were written by Thomas Schnauz.

== Reception ==
"Breathe" received critical acclaim. On Rotten Tomatoes, it garnered a 94% rating with an average score of 8.4/10 based on 17 reviews. The site consensus reads, "Better Call Saul's exceptional ensemble continues its excellent character work in 'Breathe'." Matt Fowler of IGN gave "Breathe" a positive review, with an 8.8 out of 10 rating and wrote that the episode "was a sublime example of how an excellently-crafted, extended scene, featuring impeccable character beats, can easily outshine the grit and grime of TV's natural tendency to wow us with shocking violence."

=== Ratings ===
"Breathe" was watched by 1.55 million viewers in the United States on its original air date.
