= Quite a Ride =

- Better Call Saul episode
- Episode no.: Season 4 Episode 5
- Directed by: Michael Morris
- Written by: Ann Cherkis
- Editing by: Skip Macdonald
- Original air date: September 3, 2018
- Running time: 54 minutes

Guest appearances
- Cara Pifko as Paige Novick; Rainer Bock as Werner Ziegler; Carlos Leal as Foreign Engineer; Keiko Agena as Viola Goto; Tina Parker as Francesca Liddy; Marlon Young as PPD Officer; Andrew Thacher as Customer; Tommy Nelson as Peewee; Carlin James as Scooter; Cory Chapman as Skippy

Episode chronology
← Previous "Talk"	Next → "Piñata"
- Better Call Saul season 4

"Quite a Ride" is the fifth episode of the fourth season of the AMC television series Better Call Saul, a spin-off series of Breaking Bad. The episode aired on September 3, 2018, on AMC in the United States. Outside of the United States, the episode premiered on the streaming service Netflix in several countries.

== Plot ==
=== Opening ===
In a flashforward to 2010, (Note: Occurring sometime between the events of the Breaking Bad episodes "Ozymandias" and "Granite State".) Saul Goodman and Francesca Liddy frantically clear out his office, shredding evidence of his involvement with Walter White. Francesca agrees to be at a telephone booth on November 12 at 3 p.m. to receive a call. (Note: This date is revealed to be Jimmy's birthday in "JMM".) (Note: This call takes place in the episode "Breaking Bad".) He gives her money and an attorney's business card and tells her that if she needs help she should say "Jimmy" sent her. As she leaves, Saul claims the last few years have been "quite a ride", then calls Ed Galbraith for a new identity.

=== Main story ===
In 2003, Jimmy sells pay-as-you-go phones to a customer who saw his "privacy sold here" sign. (Note: As seen in "Talk".) He then starts selling prepaid phones on the street, which proves successful until he is mugged by three teenagers. Kim Wexler tends to his wounds while Jimmy is concerned that he did not realize the teenagers' intent because he was not thinking clearly. He promises to call the psychiatrist Kim recommended, and the next day removes the storefront sign on CC Mobile.

Mike Ehrmantraut escorts engineers through the laundry to evaluate it as a site for Gus Fring's planned underground meth lab. One glibly asserts he can easily do the job but is turned away by Gus, who has been listening in from a nearby room. Another, Werner Ziegler, impresses Gus by forthrightly expressing his concerns about the risk, calling it difficult but not impossible. Gus offers him the job of planning and overseeing the lab's construction.

As Kim thrives in the environment of her pro bono criminal defense work, Paige Novick calls from Mesa Verde and insists they need her help immediately to fix recently filed paperwork, but Kim sees her criminal defense cases through before responding. Upon reaching Mesa Verde, Paige informs her that the bank's legal staff had to drop everything and fix the problem, and reminds her that when she became Mesa Verde's outside counsel, she promised that the bank would be her sole focus. Kim apologizes and promises it will not happen again.

Jimmy meets Howard Hamlin in the courthouse restroom and sees that he appears harried. Jimmy offers the phone number of the therapist Kim recommended, but Howard claims he is already going to therapy, so Jimmy throws the number away. Jimmy meets with his probation officer and states his intent to resume practicing law once his one-year suspension is over. (Note: As seen in "Off Brand".)

== Production ==
This is the first episode of Better Call Saul to include scenes that take place during the Breaking Bad series narrative, using the set for Saul Goodman's law offices. Among the possessions that Saul extracts from the wall are passports and a shoebox of video tapes of the Saul Goodman television commercials, which according to Bob Odenkirk, are the same tapes seen in the flash-forward to Saul's new identity "Gene" in the pilot episode. Portions of the episode were shot at the Dog House, a real drive-up diner in Albuquerque and previously used as Jesse Pinkman's hangout during Breaking Bad. The song "Street Life" by Randy Crawford is played during the montage in which Jimmy sells mobile phones on the street.

According to writer Thomas Schnauz, the writers did not have an established plan related to the planned phone call in the flashforward scene. It was later referenced in the sixth season episode "Breaking Bad", which was written by Schnauz. Schnauz says the call was not mentioned in the scripts when they broke out from the writers room, but added later by Peter Gould and "Quite a Ride" writer Ann Cherkis. Like Breaking Bad and unlike the rest of Better Call Saul, the opening flashforward was shot on non-digital film camera.

== Reception ==
On Rotten Tomatoes, Quite a Ride had an 100% rating with an average of 9.62 out of 10 from 15 reviews. The site's consensus reads, "Saul goes full Breaking Bad in an exciting, emotional episode that proves 'Quite a Ride'."

=== Ratings ===
"Quite a Ride" was watched by 1.53 million viewers on its first broadcast, earning a 0.4 ratings for viewers between 18 and 49.
