= Something Stupid (Better Call Saul) =

- Better Call Saul episode
- Episode no.: Season 4 Episode 7
- Directed by: Deborah Chow
- Written by: Alison Tatlock
- Editing by: Skip Macdonald
- Original air date: September 17, 2018
- Running time: 42 minutes

Guest appearances
- Mark Margolis as Hector Salamanca; Lavell Crawford as Huell Babineaux; Rainer Bock as Werner Ziegler; Dennis Boutsikaris as Rich Schweikart; Poorna Jagannathan as Dr. Maureen Bruckner; Keiko Agena as Viola Goto; Colby French as Officer Platt; Julie Pearl as ADA Suzanne Ericsen; Ben Bela Böhm as Kai; Stefan Kapičić as Casper

Episode chronology
← Previous "Piñata"	Next → "Coushatta"
- Better Call Saul season 4

"Something Stupid" is the seventh episode of the fourth season of the AMC television series Better Call Saul, a spin-off series of Breaking Bad. The episode aired on September 17, 2018, on AMC in the United States. Outside of the United States, the episode premiered on the streaming service Netflix in several countries.

== Plot ==
=== Opening ===
Over an eight-month period that ends in early 2004, Jimmy McGill and Kim Wexler drift further apart. Kim's arm heals and she thrives at Schweikart & Cokely. Jimmy continues working at CC Mobile, but his side business re-selling prepaid phones continues to grow. Jimmy's increasing contacts with Albuquerque's criminals cause him to frequently use his "Saul Goodman" alias.

=== Main story ===
Jimmy shows Huell Babineaux a prospective space for his new law office, intending to share it with Kim. Jimmy and Kim attend a Schweikart & Cokely reception; initially charming, he increasingly feels awkward and ducks into Kim's office and realizes how much better her workspace is than what he showed Huell. After returning to the party he creates a spectacle by proposing increasingly grandiose ideas for the firm's annual company retreat, upsetting Rich Schweikart and Kim.

Dr. Bruckner shows Gus Fring a video showing Hector Salamanca has improved cognitively and has limited mobility in his right hand. Bruckner dismisses Hector knocking over a water glass as involuntary, but Gus sees that Hector did it purposely so he could ogle the nurse who cleaned it up. Gus tells Bruckner to end treatment, in effect trapping Hector's healed mind inside his unhealed body.

Werner Ziegler's crew excavates the meth lab. Work proceeds slowly, tensions rise, and Kai and Casper get into a shoving match, requiring Mike Ehrmantraut to intervene. Mike wonders if they would be better off without Kai, but Werner suggests the crew needs rest and relaxation since they have been working longer than anticipated.

Jimmy continues to re-sell phones, with his business now based in a van on the city's outskirts. An off-duty police officer arrives and suggests Jimmy target a better class of customers, while Jimmy argues that his business is legitimate. Huell returns from buying lunch but is wearing headphones and does not recognize the context of the discussion, so he strikes the officer with the shopping bag. The officer knows Huell from previous run-ins and arrests him. Kim agrees to represent Huell but refuses to use tricks to ruin the cop's reputation. She wants Jimmy to guarantee that Huell will not flee, but Jimmy's reply is unconvincing. Kim tries to negotiate a plea bargain, but prosecutor Suzanne Ericsen refuses to deal. Kim goes to buy office supplies, then calls Jimmy and tells him to stop whatever he is doing to help Huell because she has a better way.

== Production ==
The song played in the opening montage is a cover of "Somethin' Stupid" performed by the band Lola Marsh. The song was originally written by Carson Parks and made famous by Frank and Nancy Sinatra; the series' music supervisor Thomas Golubić commissioned Lola Marsh for the cover for this episode.

== Reception ==
"Something Stupid" received critical acclaim from critics. On Rotten Tomatoes, it garnered a perfect 100% rating with an average score of 8.14/10 based on 12 reviews. The site's critical consensus is, "'Something Stupid' sees director Deborah Chow delivering an episode that's visually striking even by Saul's high standards." In an 8.7-star review, Matt Fowler of IGN called the episode "great" but also seemed like the first half of a bigger arc. Writing for Rolling Stone, Alan Sepinwall praised Chow's direction (particularly the montages and the different point-of-view shots), hoping that the episode won't be her last entry in the series. However, he criticized the lack of Nacho's appearance, describing the character's absence as "particularly glaring because of how hopeless his situation seemed when we last saw him with his father".

For his work on this episode, Thomas Golubić was nominated for the Primetime Emmy Award for Outstanding Music Supervision.

=== Ratings ===
"Something Stupid" was watched by 1.35 million viewers on its first broadcast, earning a 0.4 rating for viewers between 18 and 49.
