= Lantern (Better Call Saul) =

- Better Call Saul episode
- Episode no.: Season 3 Episode 10
- Directed by: Peter Gould
- Written by: Gennifer Hutchison
- Original air date: June 19, 2017
- Running time: 56 minutes

Guest appearances
- Javier Grajeda as Juan Bolsa; Jessie Ennis as Erin Brill; Bonnie Bartlett as Helen; Jean Effron as Irene Landry; Phyllis Applegate as Myrtle; Carol Mansell as Rose; Tina Parker as Francesca Liddy; Juan Carlos Cantu as Manuel Varga; Vincent Fuentes as Arturo Colon; Mark Margolis as Hector Salamanca

Episode chronology
← Previous "Fall"	Next → "Smoke"
- Better Call Saul season 3

"Lantern" is the tenth and final episode of the third season of the American television drama series Better Call Saul, the spinoff series of Breaking Bad. Written by Gennifer Hutchison and directed by series co-creator Peter Gould, "Lantern" aired on AMC in the United States on June 19, 2017. Outside of the United States, the episode premiered on streaming service Netflix in several countries.

In the episode, Jimmy plans to help Irene recover the trust of her friends at Sandpiper Crossing at the cost of his reputation, while Chuck is forced by Howard to resign from HHM, eventually causing a relapse of his condition. Meanwhile, Kim recovers at home from her wounds from the car crash, and Hector collapses from a stroke caused by Nacho.

The episode was seen by an estimated 1.85 million household viewers upon release, the most watched episode of the third season. This episode marks the final regular appearance of Michael McKean (Chuck McGill).

== Plot ==
=== Opening ===
In a flashback, a young Chuck McGill reads The Adventures of Mabel to a younger Jimmy McGill in a tent outside their family's Cicero, Illinois house. The camera zooms in on a lantern.

=== Main story ===
Following her car crash, (Note: As depicted in "Fall".) Kim Wexler's broken arm is in a cast. She returns to the crash site with Jimmy and picks up her scattered papers. The following morning, Jimmy feels responsible because Kim took on a second client to help pay for their shared office space. Jimmy and Kim vacate their office to save money by having Kim work from home, with Francesca returning to work at the Motor Vehicle Division.

Hector Salamanca pays Nacho Varga's father, Manuel, for use of Manuel's upholstery shop as a front for Hector's drug business. Manuel reluctantly takes the money to avoid retaliation. Nacho plans to ambush Hector but is pulled into a meeting between Hector, Gus Fring, and Juan Bolsa. Juan says Gus' organization will permanently handle cross-border smuggling for both Gus' operation and Hector's. An enraged Hector suffers a stroke, and Gus saves his life by performing CPR. Following Mike's earlier advice, Nacho takes the fake capsules from Hector and replaces them with Hector's real medication. Gus looks at Nacho suspiciously but says nothing.

Jimmy expects Irene Landry's friends to forgive her after she accepted the Sandpiper settlement, but finds they still do not trust her, believing she will do anything to get on their good side. He stages an argument with Erin Brill and "accidentally" admits to tricking Irene, vindicating her to her friends and causing her to withdraw her acceptance, but ruining his elder law practice.

Chuck promises to abandon his lawsuit if he can stay at HHM. Instead, Howard presents Chuck a check for $3 million — the first installment of Chuck's buyout. Howard criticizes Chuck for prioritizing his vendetta against Jimmy, but praises Chuck profusely as he informs HHM's employees of Chuck's immediate retirement. Jimmy tries to make amends with Chuck, who retorts that Jimmy was never all that important to him. After Jimmy leaves, Chuck's EHS symptoms return and he destroys the walls of his house while trying to find the device that is making his electricity meter run. Unable to find the source, he destroys the meter in frustration. Five days later, (Note: As stated in "Smoke".) Chuck kicks his desk several times, deliberately knocking over a gas lantern and starting a fire.

== Production ==
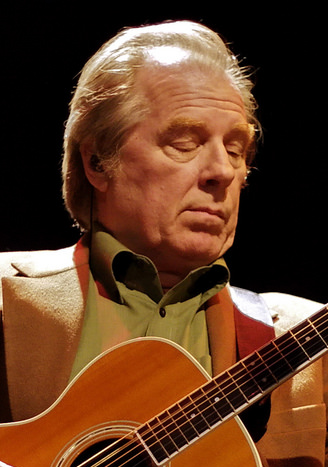
Michael McKean made his final regular appearance as Chuck McGill in this episode

The episode was directed by series co-creator Peter Gould, who previously co-wrote "Mabel" earlier in the season, and written by Gennifer Hutchison, who previously wrote the episode "Sunk Costs".

=== Casting ===
This episode marks the final regular appearance of Chuck McGill. In the final scene, Chuck appears to die via suicide by kicking the lantern off his table and burning his house down. Speculation arose over whether or not the act was actually fatal; the National Suicide Prevention Lifeline's toll-free number also appears onscreen. However, McKean confirmed that Chuck is indeed dead, stating, "If Chuck is the person that Jimmy cared for and took care of, and who transformed into his antagonist, and then transformed into this wreck — this person who has no choice but to try and fix himself and has no tools for himself — it seemed like a logical step."

== Reception ==
=== Ratings ===
Upon airing, the episode was watched by 1.85 million American viewers, and an 18-49 rating of 0.6.

=== Critical reception ===
The episode received critical acclaim. On Rotten Tomatoes, it attained a 92% rating with an average score of 8.79/10 based on 13 reviews. Terri Schwartz of IGN rated the episode 9.5/10 stars, saying "Better Call Saul pulled off a fantastic Season 3 finale that perfectly balanced its storylines and brought a big lesson to Jimmy's doorstep. With some hugely impactful moments that were both incredibly emotional and long-awaited by fans, "Lantern" proves that Better Call Saul is better than it's ever been with Season 3." Alan Sepinwall of Uproxx praised the final scene, remarking "the focus was primarily on sending off Chuck, and the finale did it right, in painstakingly painful fashion."
