= Amarillo (Better Call Saul) =

- Better Call Saul episode
- Episode no.: Season 2 Episode 3
- Directed by: Scott Winant
- Written by: Jonathan Glatzer
- Original air date: February 29, 2016
- Running time: 42 minutes

Guest appearances
- Ed Begley Jr. as Clifford Main; Kerry Condon as Stacey Ehrmantraut; Jessie Ennis as Erin Brill; Joe DeRosa as Dr. Caldera; Josh Fadem as Joey Dixon; Carol Herman as Geraldine Strauss; Omar Maskati as Omar; Julian Bonfiglio as The Sound Guy; Abigail Zoe Lewis as Kaylee Ehrmantraut

Episode chronology
← Previous "Cobbler"	Next → "Gloves Off"
- Better Call Saul season 2

"Amarillo" is the third episode of the second season of the AMC television series Better Call Saul, a spin-off series of Breaking Bad. The episode aired on February 29, 2016 on AMC in the United States. Outside of the United States, the episode premiered on streaming service Netflix in several countries.

== Plot ==
=== Opening ===
In Amarillo, Texas, Jimmy McGill bribes a Sandpiper bus driver to fake a mechanical breakdown, which allows Jimmy to sign up residents as plaintiffs for the lawsuit while technically complying with bar association rules against direct solicitation.

=== Main story ===
Jimmy presents his outreach report at a Hamlin, Hamlin & McGill-Davis & Main strategy conference and announces he has obtained 24 more plaintiffs. Chuck McGill expresses suspicion, pointing out there was only one response to the notices the attorneys mailed to Sandpiper residents. Jimmy claims that in retirement homes news spreads quickly by word of mouth, which satisfies everyone but Kim Wexler. She warns Jimmy to operate ethically since she recommended him to D&M and his actions reflect on her.

Jimmy finds that mailed notices to Sandpiper residents are not successful because residents ignore them or Sandpiper staff intercepts their mail, so he suggests filming a television ad. Clifford Main is intrigued and promises to discuss it after returning from a business trip. Jimmy views an ad previously used by D&M and finds it lacks "showmanship".

Jimmy hires the camera crew he previously used (Note: From "Hero".) and films an ad of his own. He decides to run it without the firm's approval and contacts a station in Colorado Springs, where no Sandpiper residents responded to the mailings. The commercial is a success, and D&M gains over a hundred new plaintiffs in a single day. Later that night, Cliff is furious to discover that Jimmy ran the ad without permission.

Stacey Ehrmantraut voices concern to Mike Ehrmantraut about gunshots she heard in her neighborhood over the past two nights. Mike does overnight surveillance without Stacey's knowledge and finds the "gunshots" were apparently the sound of early morning newspaper deliveries hitting the sidewalk. Stacey calls Mike later in the morning and says there were more gunshots the night before. He visits her house and she points out a chip in an outside wall which she insists is from a bullet. Rather than argue, Mike tells Stacey he will help her move out of the neighborhood.

Dr. Caldera offers Mike a lucrative job as a loan shark’s enforcer, which he declines; Caldera points out that if Mike wants "next-level pay", he must be willing to do "next-level work". Mike later receives a call from Caldera, who tells him about a job offer with a client who specifically requested Mike. Mike meets the client, who is revealed to be Nacho Varga.

== Reception ==
=== Ratings ===
Upon airing, the episode received 2.20 million American viewers, and an 18–49 rating of 1.0.

=== Critical reception ===
Terri Schwartz of IGN gave the episode an 8.5 rating, writing "Better Call Saul is right for leaning into the sense of dread its existence creates, and it does a great job of using that to its advantage in 'Amarillo'." Nicholas Parco of the New York Daily News wrote, "'Amarillo' sets up two important scenarios moving forward: McGill will deal with the fallout of his cleverness, for the first time at Davis & Main, while Ehrmantraut is about to enter the underworld of Albuquerque, on Nacho's behalf."

Donna Bowman of The A.V. Club gave the episode an A− rating, writing, "as season 2 hits its stride, Gilligan and Gould are doubling down on their radical narrative strategy of simplicity. Characters pause before they make decisions. The small and finite set of contexts and causes impinging on them is clearly delineated. Consequences proceed directly from actions. And at the end of every episode, Jimmy and Mike, the protagonists of the only two plotlines, have moved a few spaces along a game board whose finish line is already set, and we know exactly what to anticipate the next time we see them."
