= Talk (Better Call Saul) =

- Better Call Saul episode
- Episode no.: Season 4 Episode 4
- Directed by: John Shiban
- Written by: Heather Marion
- Original air date: August 27, 2018
- Running time: 47 minutes

Guest appearances
- Kerry Condon as Stacey Ehrmantraut; Tamara Tunie as Anita; Franc Ross as Ira; Ethan Phillips as Judge Benedict Munsinger; Marc Evan Jackson as Henry DeVore; Juan Carlos Cantu as Manuel Varga; Daniel and Luis Moncada as Leonel and Marco Salamanca; Jeremiah Bitsui as Victor; Ray Campbell as Tyrus Kitt

Episode chronology
← Previous "Something Beautiful"	Next → "Quite a Ride"
- Better Call Saul season 4

"Talk" is the fourth episode of the fourth season of the American television drama series Better Call Saul, the spinoff series of Breaking Bad. Written by Heather Marion and directed by John Shiban, "Talk" aired on AMC in the United States on August 27, 2018. Outside of the United States, the episode premiered on streaming service Netflix in several countries.

== Plot ==
=== Opening ===
In a flashback, Mike Ehrmantraut pours concrete for a carport and allows his young son Matty to write his name in it. In the present, Mike is at a group therapy session with Stacey Ehrmantraut and ends his comments by saying "You wanted me to talk. I talked."

=== Main story ===
Jimmy McGill is offered a manager's position at a cellular phone store. He initially declines, but when Kim Wexler suggests he see a therapist, he accepts. The store sees little traffic and Jimmy becomes bored. Ira pays Jimmy his share from the sale of the stolen Hummel figurine (Note: As seen in "Something Beautiful".) and offers to steal again. Ira says he uses a new phone for every job, which inspires Jimmy to re-sell pay-as-you-go phones on the street. Kim spends the day in Judge Munsinger's courtroom, hoping to rekindle her love of lawyering. During a recess, Munsinger advises her to continue practicing corporate law and warns her that if she remains, he will assign her pro bono criminal defense cases. When Munsinger retakes the bench, Kim is still there.

As part of covering up the fake attack on Nacho Varga and Arturo Colon, Victor sells the Salamancas' portion of the drugs to the Espinosa gang. After Nacho tips them off, the Cousins kill most of the Espinosas and recover the "stolen" drugs, then return to Mexico to avoid the police. Nacho recognizes that Gus Fring can now expand his drug territory but does not yet see the full scope of Gus's plan. Nacho stays with his father while he recovers from his wounds.

Mike tells Anita that Henry, another member of their support group, is falsely claiming to have a wife who died. At the next meeting, Stacey says she was able to get through most of the day without thinking of Matt, which prompts Henry to talk about his dead wife; Mike confronts Henry, who wordlessly leaves. Mike then condemns the group for being so self-absorbed they were unable to see through Henry's falsehoods. He ends the conversation with: "You wanted me to talk. I talked."

After performing another Madrigal site inspection, (Note: As seen in "Smoke".) Mike meets with Gus, who complains that Mike did not tell him Nacho intended to kill Hector Salamanca. (Note: As seen in "Expenses".) Mike points out that he previously promised only not to kill Hector himself. (Note: As seen in "Sunk Costs".) Mike surmises Gus has another motive for the meeting and asks for details about "the job" Gus wants done.

== Production ==
The episode was directed by John Shiban, his third directing credit for the series. Shiban was a writer and producer during the second and third seasons of Breaking Bad.

== Reception ==
"Talk" received critical acclaim, with many critics praising Jonathan Banks's performance in the episode. On Rotten Tomatoes, it garnered a perfect 100% rating with an average score of 7.93/10 based on 13 reviews. The site's consensus reads, "Ugly feelings loom large in 'Talk', an installment that manages to lay foundations for future episodes without losing its dramatic own hold."

=== Ratings ===
"Talk" was watched by 1.53 million viewers on its first broadcast, earning a 0.4 ratings for viewers between 18 and 49.

=== Accolades ===
This episode was nominated for two Primetime Emmy Awards, Larry Benjamin, Kevin Valentine, and Phillip W. Palmer were nominated for Outstanding Sound Mixing for a Comedy or Drama Series, while Kurt Nicholas Forshager, Kathryn Madsen, Mark Cookson, Matt Temple, Jane Boegel-Koch, Jason Newman, Jeff Cranford, and Gregg Barbanell were nominated for Outstanding Sound Editing for a Comedy or Drama Series.
