= Chuck McGill =

Fictional character from Better Call Saul

- Better Call Saul character
- Michael McKean as Chuck McGill in a promotional poster for Better Call Saul's third season
- First appearance: "Uno"; February 8, 2015
- Last appearance: "Saul Gone"; August 15, 2022
- Created by: Vince Gilligan; Peter Gould
- Portrayed by: Michael McKean; Gabriel Rush (adolescent)

In-universe information
- Full name: Charles Lindbergh McGill
- Gender: Male
- Occupation: Attorney; Criminal lawyer; Name partner at Hamlin, Hamlin & McGill
- Affiliation: Hamlin, Hamlin & McGill (HHM)
- Family: Charles McGill Sr. (father); Ruth McGill (mother); Jimmy McGill (brother); Kim Wexler (sister-in-law)
- Spouse: Rebecca Bois (divorced)
- Home: Albuquerque, New Mexico, United States
- Nationality: American
- Ethnicity: Irish
- Birthplace: Cicero, Illinois, United States
- Date of birth: 1944
- Date of death: March 28, 2003 (aged 58–59)
- Alma mater: University of Pennsylvania; Georgetown University
- Partners: George Hamlin; Howard Hamlin

Charles Lindbergh McGill is a fictional character and one of the main antagonists of the crime drama television series Better Call Saul, a spin-off prequel to Breaking Bad. Chuck is portrayed by Michael McKean and was created by Vince Gilligan and Peter Gould.

Chuck was born in Cicero, Illinois, in the United States and is the eldest son of Ruth and Charles McGill Sr. He is the older brother of the titular character Jimmy McGill, primarily known by his alias Saul Goodman. Chuck is a successful attorney who runs a major law firm, Hamlin, Hamlin, & McGill (HHM), with business partner and friend Howard Hamlin. However, at the time the series begins, Chuck has become a recluse, believing that he has electromagnetic hypersensitivity. He was amicably divorced from Rebecca Bois, who is unaware of his psychosomatic illness, a few years before the events of Better Call Saul.

Although in the first season Chuck acts supportive of Jimmy, he in fact greatly resents his younger brother because of his charismatic personality and his past as a conman. From the second season onward, Chuck begins openly feuding with Jimmy and ultimately becomes his nemesis. His betrayal of and opposition to Jimmy and his subsequent death serve as a catalyst for Jimmy's transformation into Saul Goodman. Chuck's influence also deeply affects Howard Hamlin and Kim Wexler.

Chuck's character development and McKean's performance throughout the first three seasons received critical acclaim, with many critics arguing that McKean gave the best performance on television in 2017.

== Conception and development ==
Michael McKean had previously worked with Vince Gilligan as the recurring character Morris Fletcher who first appeared in The X-Files episode "Dreamland." The two kept in touch since about potential projects, although during that time much of McKean's work was in New York City for Broadway theatre while Gilligan was in Los Angeles working in television.

When Gilligan eventually contacted McKean about acting in Better Call Saul, he accepted the role knowing only the bare minimum regarding Chuck's electromagnetic sensitivity, since he was a fan of Breaking Bad and trusted Gilligan.

When filming of Better Call Saul started in 2014, McKean had to initially split his time between playing Chuck and performing in All the Way, a Broadway play that coincidentally also starred Bryan Cranston who had played Walter White in Breaking Bad. When McKean's casting was announced in April 2014, his character was deliberately misnamed as "Dr. Thurber," which McKean says was based on humorist James Thurber. Chuck's real name, Charles Lindbergh McGill, was inspired by the aviator Charles Lindbergh.

In interviews, McKean has stated that while Chuck did make efforts to foil Jimmy's attempts to get ahead as a lawyer, it wasn't always planned that Chuck would resort to underhanded tricks. He described Chuck as a person who, until the onset of his belief that he suffered from electromagnetic sensitivity, had "followed all the rules" and who suddenly saw all he had slip away. For this reason, Chuck could not understand how, in contrast, someone like Jimmy who didn't follow the rules could be thriving. Gilligan said that Chuck was originally planned as a Mycroft Holmes character, emotionally damaged but supportive of Jimmy's efforts, with Howard Hamlin to serve as the antagonist. However, as they filmed the initial episodes and saw the interactions, the writing team came to the idea of making Chuck the antagonist, while Howard would be more supportive of Jimmy, belying his outward rigor.

To aid in their portrayals of the characters, McKean and Odenkirk discussed Chuck and Jimmy's relationships with their parents and the way their parents would have treated them.

McKean stated that Gilligan and Gould told actors at the start of the season where generally they would like to see the characters go. Eventually, with little notice, Gilligan and Gould would give more specific direction to actors. Despite the short notice, McKean trusted that the showrunners were doing the right thing with the character.

Around the time of filming the third season's seventh episode "Expenses," McKean received Chuck's "death call." Gilligan and Gould informed him that Chuck would die in that season's finale, the tenth episode, "Lantern." McKean had been expecting the call based on the character's arc and had no regrets or issues with it. He said, "Chuck did not belong in Jimmy’s universe by the time he becomes Saul Goodman, so I knew that it was very possible [Chuck would die before that]."

== Character biography ==
Chuck McGill was born in 1944, and grew up in Cicero, Illinois. At the age of 14, he graduated from Francis Xavier High School as valedictorian, the youngest graduate in the school's history. He completed his undergraduate degree at the University of Pennsylvania and later graduated magna cum laude from Georgetown University Law Center. After clerking at both the Delaware Court of Chancery and the United States Court of Appeals for the Tenth Circuit, Chuck joined George Hamlin's solo practice in Albuquerque, New Mexico. Over the next 23 years, the two men, later joined by George's son Howard, built Hamlin, Hamlin & McGill into one of the largest law firms in the Southwestern United States. Early in his career, Chuck excelled in criminal law, famously arguing and winning the precedent-setting case State v. Gonzalez.

In 1992, ten years before the events of Better Call Saul, Chuck defended his younger brother Jimmy after Jimmy defecated through the sunroof of a romantic rival's BMW, unaware the man's children were in the back seat. As a condition of helping Jimmy, Chuck demanded that Jimmy abandon his work as a con artist and take a legitimate job in HHM's mailroom. While working in HHM's mailroom, Jimmy was inspired by Chuck's skill as an attorney and decided to become one as well. To that end, he secretly completed his college degree, attended a correspondence law school, and passed the bar exam. However, while Jimmy's co-worker, later romantic partner, Kim Wexler, would become an associate attorney at HHM, Jimmy was not hired, so he left the firm's mailroom to build his own practice.

Around the time of his divorce from Rebecca Bois, Chuck began to believe he suffered from electromagnetic hypersensitivity (EHS) and took a leave of absence from HHM. During this time, Jimmy took care of Chuck by buying and delivering his groceries and newspapers every day.

=== Season 1 ===
Jimmy continues to help Chuck with daily chores at his home during his leave of absence, where he still maintains his position as a senior partner. Howard attempts to buy out Chuck's share of HHM with a token payment, but Jimmy makes Howard back down by demanding that Howard pay Chuck the full value.

After Jimmy stages a fake rescue of a billboard worker to drum up publicity for his firm, he removes Chuck's local newspaper from his daily delivery to hide the fake rescue. Chuck resorts to stealing the neighbor's paper (leaving $5 as payment), which leads to the police breaking into his home and tasing him. Chuck is taken to the hospital, and the doctor proves to Jimmy that Chuck's illness is psychosomatic. Jimmy refuses the doctor's recommendation to have Chuck committed to a mental institution and insists that he can care for Chuck in Chuck's home.

Jimmy later suspects the Sandpiper Crossing retirement community is overcharging its residents, so he collects shredded documents from the trash and starts piecing them together at Chuck's house. Chuck is impressed with Jimmy's legal instincts and steps in to help, discovering key documents that prove Jimmy is correct. Jimmy and Chuck attempt to get Sandpiper to settle the case out of court, but Sandpiper's lawyers refuse. Jimmy and Chuck begin a class action lawsuit and continue to collect evidence, which rekindles Chuck's enthusiasm for the law. While working with Jimmy, Chuck absentmindedly goes outside to retrieve documents from Jimmy's car without his usual EHS precautions. Chuck suggests the case is too large for the two of them alone and that they should get HHM's help. Howard agrees to take the case and offers Jimmy a small of counsel fee and a percentage of the judgment or settlement, but cuts him out of active participation.

Jimmy soon discovers that Chuck secretly used Howard to get him off the case — the same way Chuck used Howard to block Jimmy from becoming an attorney at HHM. Jimmy confronts Chuck, who confesses that he doesn't consider him a "real lawyer", believing he is still the same "Slippin' Jimmy" from Cicero. Feeling betrayed, Jimmy cuts ties with Chuck and arranges for Howard to take over Chuck's care. Howard assigns Ernesto to care for Chuck.

=== Season 2 ===
As the Sandpiper case grows, HHM brings in Davis & Main to assist. D&M hires Jimmy as an associate due to his familiarity with the case and rapport with the clients. Wanting to "bear witness" to his brother's work ethic, Chuck begins more frequently fighting his EHS to join in meetings, to Jimmy's discomfort.

Chuck later becomes suspicious of Jimmy's questionable tactics to obtain new plaintiffs in the case. Jimmy produces a television ad to reach even more potential plaintiffs and airs it without approval from Davis & Main, to the firm's great disdain. Afterwards, Jimmy decides to quit and behaves in a way that forces Davis & Main to terminate him without cause.

Due to Kim being aware of the ad, and not informing the partners of HHM, she is reassigned to entry-level document review work. To regain Howard's favor, she brings in a new client, Mesa Verde bank, however, she's still kept in doc review. Chuck convinces Howard to give her back her old position, while also attempting to steer her away from Jimmy's bad influence, revealing his belief that Jimmy stole thousands of dollars from their father's convenience store, forcing it to be shut down.

Kim eventually decides to leave HHM to start her own firm in an office space shared with Jimmy. She initially persuades Mesa Verde to become her client, but upon learning of this development, Chuck personally assists Howard in retaining Mesa Verde's business.

Chuck has a particularly bad EHS episode as a result of the trip, so Ernesto calls Jimmy for help, and he offers to stay with Chuck overnight. Annoyed at his brother for "taking Mesa Verde" away from Kim, he uses the opportunity to alter documents Chuck has prepared for a new Mesa Verde branch application. When the state banking board reviews the application, it discovers the errors, which results in a delay, a mistake Chuck vehemently refuses to believe he made. Mesa Verde's president and counsel take the bank's business to Kim, and Chuck immediately suspects Jimmy sabotaged him. He confronts Jimmy and Kim about the crime, with Kim defending Jimmy, though secretly aware of the truth.

Chuck has Ernesto track down an all-night copy store, which he suspects Jimmy used, and prepares to confront the clerk to identify Jimmy. However, Jimmy had arrived earlier and bribed the clerk for his silence. Chuck attempts to question the clerk, but his EHS causes him to collapse and hit his head on the counter. Jimmy, who had been watching from across the street, takes the risk and enters the store to administer first aid and has the clerk summon an ambulance. At the hospital, Chuck wonders how Jimmy was on the scene so quickly, and Ernesto falsely claims to have called him out of concern for Chuck's health. Chuck later appears to have a major mental breakdown, covering the entire house in foil and deciding to quit the firm, admitting to his "mistake". Feeling guilty, Jimmy confesses to the document tampering in an effort to calm Chuck down. After Jimmy leaves however, Chuck reveals a hidden voice recorder, which he activated before Jimmy's arrival.

=== Season 3 ===
While removing the foil in the house, Jimmy attempts to reconnect with Chuck, but he promises Jimmy consequences for his Mesa Verde fraud. Chuck and Howard discuss the recording, which Howard says is not admissible in court, but Chuck arranges for Ernesto to hear it, then swears him to silence. As Chuck expected, Ernesto tells Kim, who then tells Jimmy, who then almost immediately breaks into Chuck's house and destroys the recording in the presence of Chuck, a private investigator, and Howard, resulting in Jimmy's arrest. Chuck suggests to the assistant district attorney that Jimmy could avoid prison by confessing to the break-in and making the confession available to the state bar association. With Jimmy facing disbarment, Kim offers to help him fight the charges.

Chuck admits to Kim that he has a copy of the recording and intends to use it at Jimmy's bar disciplinary hearing, which means Jimmy and Kim will be able to cross-examine him after he authenticates it. Kim secretly cancels the repairman Chuck had called to fix the door Jimmy destroyed during the break-in and Jimmy asks Mike Ehrmantraut to pose as a repairman; Mike fixes the door while clandestinely photographing Chuck's home to document his bizarre living conditions. The hearing room is prepared for Chuck's testimony, including turning off all electrical devices and storing cell phones outside the room. Jimmy invites Chuck's ex-wife Rebecca to the hearing, claiming Chuck is in distress and needs her help, but Chuck sees it as an attempt to rattle him before he testifies. When Jimmy cross-examines Chuck about how sensitive he is to electricity, Chuck suspects a trick and accuses Jimmy of keeping his cell phone. Jimmy then reveals that he had Huell Babineaux secretly place Jimmy's cell phone battery in Chuck's pocket, and that Chuck carried it for more than an hour without noticing. The suggestion that he is mentally ill unnerves Chuck, who launches into an extended tirade about Jimmy; he realizes too late that his emotionally charged outburst has convinced the panel of judges that he is an unreliable witness.

Jimmy is given a year's suspension, but not disbarred. Chuck shutters himself in his home, and Rebecca tries to get Jimmy to help her talk to him, but Jimmy refuses. Howard suggests Chuck consider Jimmy's suspension a victory and move on, and Chuck seems to agree. The possibility that his illness is psychosomatic leads Chuck to begin seeing Dr. Cruz, a therapist who helps him cope with his symptoms to the point where he can walk outside and perform chores such as grocery shopping.

When Jimmy meets with his malpractice insurer to obtain a refund on his premium, he finds that his policy must remain in effect during his suspension, so he feigns an emotional breakdown about Chuck's condition, which prompts the insurance company's representatives to meet with Howard and Chuck. The insurers inform them that HHM's malpractice rates will rise substantially unless another attorney is assigned to constantly supervise Chuck. Chuck wants to fight, but Howard encourages him to retire. Chuck then sues HHM, hoping this will force Howard to back down. To his surprise, Howard buys out Chuck's share of the partnership, using personal funds and loans to make the first of three $3 million payments. Howard then announces that Chuck has retired, effective immediately.

When Kim is hospitalized after a car crash, Jimmy tries to make amends with Chuck who rebuffs him, saying that Jimmy was never really all that important to him. Chuck's EHS symptoms reemerge and he becomes obsessed with finding a device that is causing his electric meter to run. He removes all his appliances, tears the walls open to remove the wiring, and finally destroys the meter. Having reached his breaking point, Chuck sits at his desk and kicks it until he knocks over a gas lantern, setting his house on fire.

=== Season 4 ===
Chuck dies in the fire he started. Jimmy is shocked at Chuck's death and believes himself to be at fault because of his interaction with the insurance company. However, Howard believes Chuck's death was his fault because he forced Chuck to retire. Upon hearing this, Jimmy allows Howard to shoulder the blame and regains his usual upbeat demeanor. Chuck leaves most of his estate to his ex-wife and $5,000 to Jimmy, which is just enough to prevent him from contesting the will. When Kim picks up Jimmy's inheritance check, Howard gives her a letter Chuck wrote to Jimmy. Kim eventually gives it to Jimmy, who reads it in her presence. The letter is undated but was apparently written while Jimmy was working in the HHM mailroom. It praises Jimmy's efforts to leave his conman past behind and work an honest job, though is condescending in nature. Jimmy dismissively calls it "nice", but Kim is visibly moved by it. Jimmy learns HHM is struggling financially because of the payments due to Chuck's estate, and because the recent events caused them to lose clients.

A year later, Jimmy attends his reinstatement hearing and is surprised to learn that his suspension will continue because he failed to address the conflict with Chuck during questioning from the panel members. Jimmy appeals, and in preparation for the hearing Kim helps him fake several public displays of grief over Chuck's death. At the appeal, Jimmy begins to read from Chuck's letter, then stops and gives an impromptu speech in which he vows to be worthy of the McGill name if reinstated. Jimmy's appeal succeeds, but he reveals to Kim that the speech was insincere and he plans to practice law as Saul Goodman.

Chuck appears in two flashbacks. The first is in "Piñata". In 1993, the staff at HHM congratulate pre-illness Chuck after he argues obscure case law to successfully close a lucrative case for the firm. The reception Chuck receives serves as a catalyst for Jimmy's subsequent legal studies, which he carries out in secret. In the second one, featured in the season finale "Winner", Chuck appears with Jimmy before the board of bar examiners during the admission of new attorneys in 1998 and provides Jimmy's ritual introduction and character reference. After the ceremony, Chuck attends a celebration for Jimmy at a karaoke bar. After Jimmy persuades an initially reluctant Chuck to sing "The Winner Takes It All" with him, Chuck takes center stage from his brother. They later that night return to Jimmy's home, drunk and singing in bed together.

=== Season 5 ===
Chuck does not appear, but his life and death continue to affect Jimmy, Howard, and Kim. Jimmy has fully embraced the Saul Goodman alias he used while selling prepaid phones, telling Kim that it gives him an instant client base for a criminal law practice. When Kim tries to talk him out of practicing law as Saul, Jimmy indicates that it is necessary if he is to escape the shadow of Chuck's professional legacy. Chuck becomes Kim's posthumous brother-in-law when she marries Jimmy, a tactic that enables Jimmy to tell Kim the truth about his work as Saul by attaching spousal privilege to their conversations.

Howard proposes hiring Jimmy at HHM, assuring him that the feud was between Jimmy and Chuck, not the firm. Jimmy is unsettled by the reminder of his past and refuses Howard's offer. Jimmy is so unnerved that he irritates Howard by using bowling balls to vandalize his car and prostitutes to disrupt his business lunch with Clifford Main. When Howard confronts Jimmy and rescinds his offer, Jimmy responds by lambasting Howard for causing Chuck's death and angrily tells him that as Saul Goodman, he has grown too big for the constraints of a job at HHM.

When Howard sees Kim at the courthouse, she tells him she quit Schweikart and Cokely and her work for Mesa Verde so that she can concentrate on pro bono criminal defense cases. Howard assumes Jimmy is behind this decision and tells Kim about Jimmy's recent harassment campaign against him. Kim laughs at Howard, says she is insulted by the idea that she cannot decide for herself, and tells him she knows Jimmy better than he does. Howard tells Kim that Chuck knew Jimmy better than anyone else.

=== Season 6 ===
When Cary Anderson, a new HHM employee, drops several cans of soda while preparing for the mediation session connected to the Sandpiper lawsuit, Howard shows him the trick of rotating the can several times to prevent it from exploding when it is opened, a method he says he learned from Chuck. Howard goes on to tell Cary that Chuck was the greatest legal mind he's ever known. However, despite Chuck being a founder of HHM, Cary has never heard of him. While confronting Jimmy and Kim after their plot humiliates him and forces a settlement of the Sandpiper case, Howard reminds Jimmy and Kim of Chuck's view that Jimmy cannot stop himself from causing harm to everyone around him.

In the series finale, Chuck appears in a flashback set before the events of Better Call Saul began, with Jimmy helping him manage his EHS symptoms by bringing him food deliveries. When Chuck asks why he does it, Jimmy says that they are brothers and that Chuck would do the same for him, which makes Chuck look very uncomfortable. Jimmy is ready to leave but Chuck insists that Jimmy stay and talk to him, which Jimmy does with visible reluctance that he mostly covers by listing his depressing roster of pathetic legal cases and embarrassing clients, including one man who was arrested for exposing his genitals in public. Chuck asks if Jimmy ever considered a different life path, to which Jimmy (perceiving that Chuck is making a non-unique and clumsy effort to convince Jimmy to stop disgracing the legal profession by working in it) retorts that Chuck never changed his path and glumly moves to leave the apartment. Before Jimmy leaves, Chuck says, "we always end up having the same conversation, don't we?". When Jimmy appears before the court to face the crimes he committed as Saul Goodman during the events of Breaking Bad, alongside shocking everyone by openly confessing to being a more than willing participant, he also confesses to tipping off the malpractice insurer about Chuck's condition to get their rates increased, directly leading to his suicide. His counsel, Bill Oakley, tells him that was not a crime, and Jimmy responds, "Yeah, it was."

== Reception ==
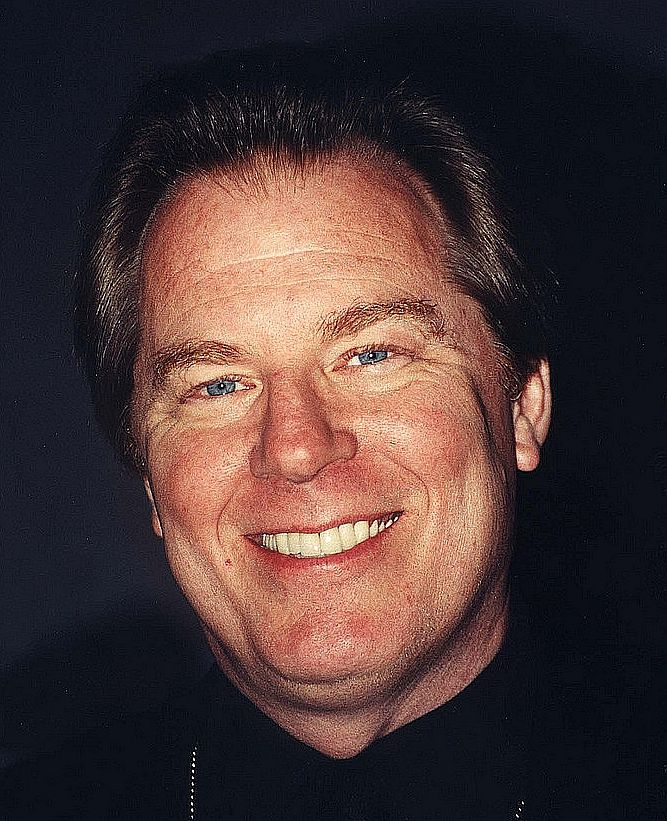
Michael McKean portrays Chuck

McKean's portrayal of Chuck McGill has received critical acclaim. For his performances, he won a Satellite Award for Best Supporting Actor in 2018 at the 22nd Satellite Awards. McKean later received a nomination for a Primetime Emmy Award for Outstanding Guest Actor in a Drama Series for his guest appearance in the fourth season.

The first season episode "Pimento" received critical acclaim, with many critics praising the performances of Bob Odenkirk and McKean. Roth Cornet of IGN gave the episode a 9.0 rating, concluding: "Better Call Saul revealed the betrayal that may very well be at the heart of what turns Jimmy McGill into Saul Goodman, as this stunningly crafted story continues to unfold."

The third season episode "Chicanery" received universal acclaim, with some critics considering it a series best. Terri Schwartz of IGN awarded the episode a perfect 10 out of 10, calling it "the best episode of Better Call Saul to date". It holds a perfect 100% on Rotten Tomatoes with an average score of 9.5/10 based on 12 reviews. The site consensus reads: "The war between Jimmy and Chuck comes to an unprecedented climax in the heartbreaking, sober, and defining 'Chicanery', an episode that clearly cements Better Call Saul as essential television." TVLine named McKean the "Performer of the Week" for his performance in this episode, writing it was the "finest showcase yet for his fascinatingly layered performance as Jimmy's brother Chuck McGill." Donna Bowman of The A.V. Club, who gave the episode an "A" rating, praised the courtroom scene, saying: "it isn’t just to give us the satisfaction of a courtroom drama, the neat ending where the truth comes out. The brilliance of this structure is to give us a slow-motion view of the heavens falling, an outcome methodically pursued by Kim and Jimmy, which nevertheless seems to give them no satisfaction."

Many critics were disappointed when McKean, who was said to have given "one of the best performances by anyone in TV all year", failed to secure an Emmy nomination in 2017 while his co-star Jonathan Banks did.

Matt Zoller Seitz of Vulture considers him to be the Better Call Saul equivalent of Breaking Bad character Skyler White.

In 2020, Screen Rant ranked him #9 among main characters for likeability, only above Hector Salamanca. It wrote: "The first few seasons of the show go into a lot of detail showing how Jimmy lost his way in his career as an honest lawyer. A big part of the issue was due to his own brother, Chuck McGill. Chuck is a successful lawyer in his own right but instead of being proud of Jimmy following in his footsteps, he tried to hold him back."

== See also ==
- List of characters in the Breaking Bad franchise
