= Howard Hamlin =

Better Call Saul character

- Better Call Saul character
- Patrick Fabian as Howard Hamlin in a promotional poster for Better Call Saul's fifth season.
- First appearance: "Uno"; February 8, 2015
- Last appearance: "Point and Shoot"; July 11, 2022
- Created by: Vince Gilligan; Peter Gould
- Portrayed by: Patrick Fabian

In-universe information
- Gender: Male
- Occupation: Attorney; Corporate lawyer; Name partner at Hamlin, Hamlin & McGill
- Affiliation: Hamlin, Hamlin & McGill
- Family: George M. Hamlin (father)
- Spouse: Cheryl Hamlin (widowed)
- Home: Albuquerque, New Mexico, United States
- Partners: George Hamlin; Chuck McGill

Howard G. Hamlin is a fictional character who appears in the crime drama television series Better Call Saul, a spin-off and prequel of Breaking Bad. He is portrayed by Patrick Fabian and was created by Vince Gilligan and Peter Gould.

Initially a foil for and longtime antagonist of Jimmy McGill, his hostility and actions towards Jimmy are later revealed to have been largely due to pressure from Chuck McGill, his business partner and Jimmy's elder brother. His attempts to correct his past behavior towards Jimmy culminate in devastating consequences.

== Development ==
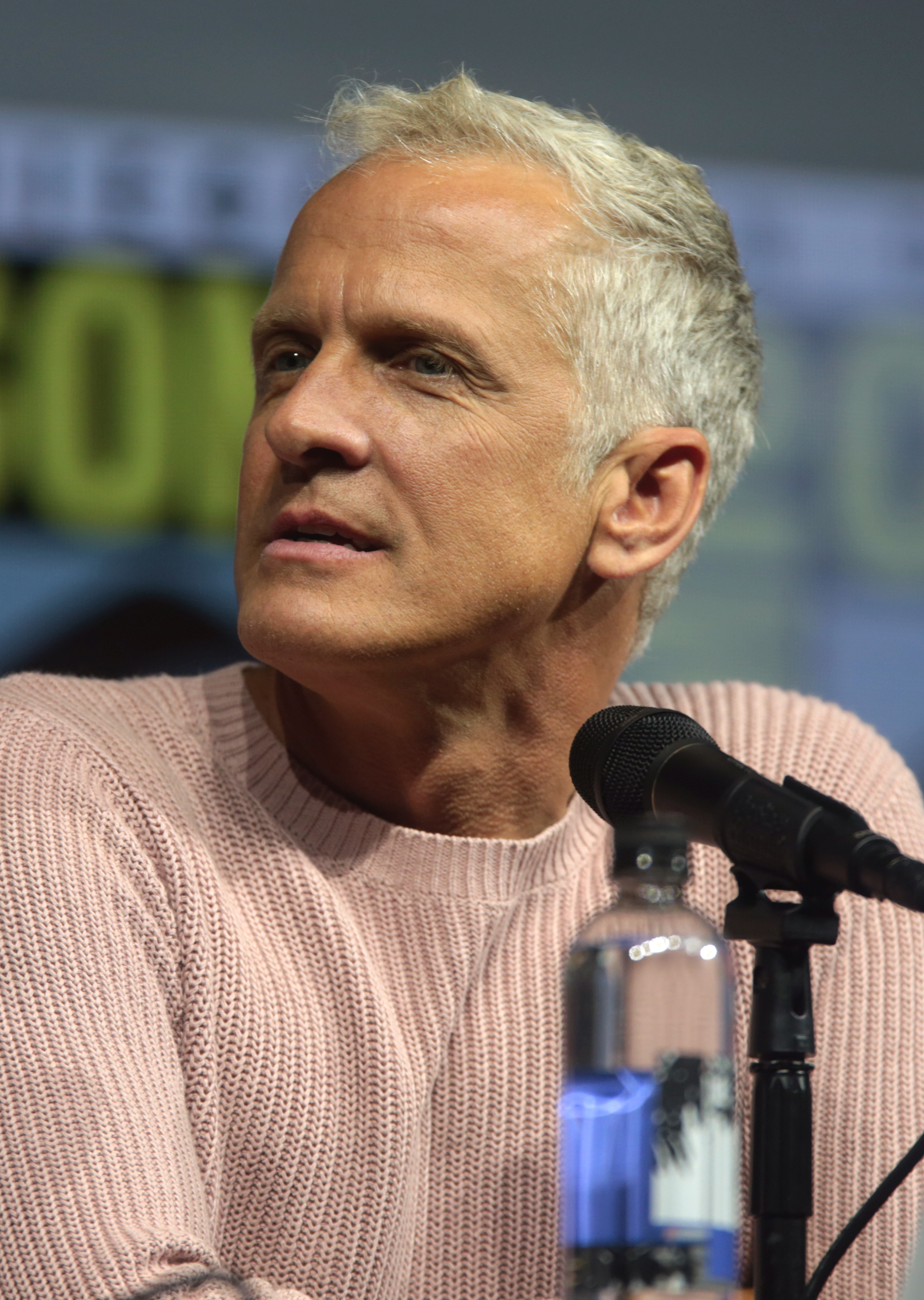
Patrick Fabian portrayed Howard Hamlin.

In May 2014, Patrick Fabian was cast in Better Call Saul, with his character described as a "Kennedy-esque lawyer who's winning at life". Though initially reported as Burt, the character's name was later revealed as Howard Hamlin. In the series, Howard is portrayed as cocky, arrogant, and self-centered. However, many fans of the show believe that Howard is actually a good person. Fabian commented by saying "You know, Jimmy called Howard 'Lord Vader' in the very first episode of Better Call Saul. And when the lead character calls your character Lord Vader, the audience goes, 'Wow, what a dick that guy's gonna be.' Then everybody starts looking at everything that falls out of my mouth as evidence backing that claim up. And even when it goes in the opposite direction—like at the end of Season 1, where it turns out I was sort of protecting Jimmy from Chuck, there is a bit of a hitch of 'Oh, maybe Howard's not so bad,' but as soon as I was quote-unquote being a dick to Kim in Season 2, they all got back on board and said, 'Yeah, he's Lord Vader.' I'm not complaining at all." Fabian has compared Howard to "sort of a Peter Pan, living a great existence..." before he meets Chuck and Jimmy McGill who "[muck] it all up." Vince Gilligan said Howard was initially meant to be the series' antagonist, and Chuck as being supportive of Jimmy's efforts, but as they filmed the initial episodes and saw the interactions, the writing team came onto the idea of making Chuck the antagonist, while Howard would be more supportive of Jimmy, belying his outward rigor. In a later interview, Fabian also implied that he does not view Howard as an antagonist.

The season six episode "Plan and Execution" features the murder of Howard by Lalo Salamanca. The writers explored dozens of possible ways for Howard's story to end. One idea they considered involved Lalo taking Howard, Jimmy, and Kim hostage but they thought Lalo killing Howard was "a perfect way to scare the ever-living shit out of Jimmy and Kim, to put a bullet in this stranger's head and move on to part two of his plan."

== Character biography ==
=== Background ===
Howard Hamlin is a skilled and affluent lawyer and one of the managing partners of the Albuquerque law firm Hamlin Hamlin & McGill (HHM). The firm was originally established by Howard's father, George, and Chuck McGill, who later added Howard as a partner. When George died and Chuck became housebound as a result of his supposed electromagnetic hypersensitivity, Howard became the firm's managing partner.

When Chuck brings his younger brother Jimmy from Chicago to turn him away from his conman past, Howard agrees to employ Jimmy in HHM's mail room. Jimmy becomes impressed with Chuck's legal work as well as that of Kim Wexler, a law student who also works in the mail room, leading Jimmy to get his own law degree through correspondence school. After Jimmy passes the bar exam, Chuck secretly instructs Howard to deny him advancement at HHM. Unaware of Chuck's machinations, Jimmy becomes resentful towards Howard and starts his own practice from an office in the back of a nail salon, which eventually becomes successful.

With Chuck unable to leave his house, Howard attempts to buy out his share of the partnership with a token payment. As Chuck's caregiver and de facto guardian, Jimmy refuses and demands that if Howard buys Chuck out, he pay the full value.

Howard drives a dark green 1998 Jaguar XJ8, with the license plate "NAMAST3" (namaste).

=== Season 1 ===
Jimmy accepts a bribe from the Kettlemans, a married couple accused of embezzlement. He spends the money on a personal appearance and wardrobe makeover and a billboard advertisement, both of which copy the signature looks of Howard and HHM. Howard persuades Kim to confront Jimmy over the imitation, but Jimmy refuses to stop. Howard sues Jimmy for trademark infringement. Jimmy is ordered to have the advertisement removed within 48 hours, but uses the opportunity to stage a phony rescue of the billboard worker, which generates favorable publicity for his law practice, though Howard and Kim see through the ruse.

When Jimmy delivers Chuck's newspapers the next day, he removes the local one so that Chuck will not see the story about the billboard rescue. Chuck braves the outdoors to take his neighbor's paper and sees the story about Jimmy's trick. The neighbor calls the police, who break into Chuck's home and use a taser to subdue him. Chuck is rushed to the hospital, where the doctor tells Jimmy that Chuck's illness is psychosomatic and recommends he be committed to a mental institution. Howard arrives and tells Jimmy the district attorney has agreed to drop the charges and allow Chuck to return home. Jimmy believes Howard does not want Chuck to be hospitalized so that Howard can continue attempting to buy out his partnership. Jimmy angrily tells Howard he intends to have Chuck committed, but tells Kim he said it only to irritate Howard.

The media attention from Jimmy's staged rescue causes him to start an elder law practice. When he uncovers possible fraud at the Sandpiper Crossing retirement home, Chuck helps him confirm the details. Jimmy and Chuck initiate a class-action suit, which becomes too large for them to handle alone, so Chuck suggests taking the case to HHM. Howard arranges for a meeting with Jimmy and Chuck at HHM and takes steps to accommodate Chuck's EHS. HHM agrees to take the case and Howard offers Jimmy twenty percent of the final judgment or settlement and an of counsel fee of $20,000, but makes clear that Jimmy will not continue to participate in the case. Jimmy demands to know why Howard has always excluded him. Howard does not provide satisfactory answers, so Jimmy angrily refuses to hand off the case.

Kim confronts Howard about his treatment of Jimmy. Howard is initially resistant, but then tells Kim the truth—that Chuck secretly asked him to block Jimmy. Jimmy figures out on his own that Chuck was responsible. He gives HHM the Sandpiper case, disengages from daily interaction with Chuck, and obtains Howard's agreement to take over Chuck's care. After seeing Jimmy's routine for himself, Howard is impressed with the time and effort Jimmy has put in and assigns Ernesto, an HHM employee, to continue caring for Chuck.

=== Season 2 ===
HHM finds that Jimmy and Chuck's assessment that Sandpiper has engaged in fraud across several states is correct. With the case becoming too big for HHM, Howard brings in another firm, Davis & Main (D&M). Kim vouches for Jimmy to managing partner Cliff Main, and the D&M partners are impressed with Jimmy's knowledge of the case and rapport with clients, so they hire him as an associate. With responsibility for client outreach, Jimmy bypasses both Howard's and Cliff's oversight to attract more plaintiffs, including a melodramatic television commercial he produces himself and airs without approval. Howard, Cliff, and Chuck reprimand Jimmy, and Howard relegates Kim to entry-level document review work for failing to warn them. Jimmy arranges to be dismissed from D&M in a way that allows him to retain his signing bonus. Kim attempts to regain her status by working her contacts to obtain a new client for HHM. She succeeds with Mesa Verde Bank, a local bank that is planning a multi-state expansion. Howard is happy to have the business, but denies Kim credit and keeps her working in document review. When Jimmy proposes they start a partnership, Kim counters with an offer to establish separate practices in a shared office. Jimmy accepts, so Kim quits HHM.

Howard and Kim each work to obtain Mesa Verde as a client. The bank's president and legal counsel, Kevin and Paige, initially agree to hire Kim. Howard and Chuck meet with Kevin and Paige, and Chuck's damning of Kim with faint praise causes them to change their minds and retain HHM. When Chuck breaks down from the stress of appearing "normal" while meeting with Kevin and Paige, Jimmy tells Ernesto he will stay overnight with Chuck. Jimmy uses the opportunity to alter several documents in an application for a new Mesa Verde branch. At the next meeting of the banking board, the errors are uncovered. With Mesa Verde facing a loss of time and money because of the incorrect documents, Kevin and Paige leave HHM and retain Kim. Chuck immediately suspects that Jimmy sabotaged him and works to prove it. He tricks Jimmy into confessing to his deceit and secretly records his confession.

=== Season 3 ===
Chuck reveals Jimmy's confession to Howard, who wonders what Chuck can do with it since it cannot be used in court, but Chuck tells Howard the recording has a use. He first arranges for Ernesto to overhear a portion of it, then swears him to silence. As Chuck intended, Ernesto informs Kim about the recording, and Kim tells Jimmy. Jimmy breaks into Chuck's house and destroys the tape. Howard and a private investigator whom Chuck hired reveal themselves and tell Jimmy they are witnesses to his crimes, enabling Chuck to report Jimmy to the police. The prosecutor assigned to the case assures Chuck she takes the charges seriously and will press for jail time, but Chuck offers to drop the charges if Jimmy faces a bar association disciplinary hearing, which will likely result in disbarment. Jimmy agrees, but Kim and he plan a defense. At the hearing, Jimmy's cross-examination and revelation of Chuck's symptoms as psychosomatic causes Chuck to break down again. Jimmy's law license is suspended for a year, but he is not disbarred; Howard tries to cheer up Chuck and tells him they should consider Jimmy's suspension a victory, but Chuck becomes even more withdrawn.

As a cost-cutting move, Jimmy attempts to obtain a refund on his malpractice insurance premium. Informed that the policy has to stay in effect in case he is sued during his suspension, Jimmy feigns worry over Chuck's condition, but his knowing smile as he leaves indicates he is aware he has caused a problem for Chuck. Insurance company representatives inform Howard and Chuck that because of Chuck's condition, he will need to be constantly supervised by another attorney or HHM will face a steep increase in its premium. Chuck wants to fight, but Howard urges him to retire, so Chuck sues HHM. Outraged that Chuck would rather bankrupt the firm than retire, Howard uses personal funds and loans to buy Chuck out of the firm. Chuck is forced to retire, and becomes even more reclusive and mentally unstable, ultimately setting fire to his house while still inside.

=== Season 4 ===
Chuck dies in the fire. Howard is his emergency contact, and after police notify him, Howard notifies Jimmy and Kim. Over the following week, Howard crafts an obituary and invites Chuck's friends and colleagues to a memorial service. Afterward, he confesses to Jimmy and Kim that he may be responsible for Chuck's death because he forced Chuck to retire after the increase in HHM's malpractice insurance premium. Relieved that someone else is taking responsibility, Jimmy continues to conceal his role in causing the insurance premium to go up and regains his usual upbeat demeanor. Howard is burdened with guilt and begins suffering from depression, while HHM suffers from his inattention, the financial strain of paying out to Chuck's estate, and the loss of clients resulting from the firm's damaged reputation. As it becomes clear that Howard is floundering, Jimmy tries a "tough love" pep talk to rouse him to action. A year after Chuck's death, Howard gives a speech at the dedication for a new law library reading room in Chuck's honor, in which he indicates that HHM has recovered its financial footing and standing in Albuquerque's legal community.

=== Season 5 ===
A once again upbeat Howard encounters Jimmy at the courthouse, now practicing under the name Saul Goodman. Howard informs Jimmy that HHM's recovery is still strong and that the firm has been restored to profitability. He invites Jimmy to lunch, where he apologizes for the firm's past treatment of Jimmy and offers him a position at HHM. Jimmy is visibly unsettled by the reminder of his past. He begins to harass Howard, including using bowling balls to vandalize Howard's expensive car and prostitutes to disrupt Howard's business lunch with Cliff. Howard later realizes that Jimmy is behind the harassment and rescinds the job offer. In a public outburst, Jimmy lashes out at Howard, blaming him for Chuck's death and claiming that as Saul Goodman, he has grown too big for the constraints of a job at HHM.

When Howard sees Kim at the courthouse, she tells him she quit Schweikart and Cokely and her work for Mesa Verde Bank so that she can concentrate on pro bono criminal defense cases. Howard tells Kim about Jimmy's recent harassment campaign against him and blames Jimmy for Kim's decision. Kim laughs at Howard, says she is insulted by the idea that she cannot decide for herself, and tells Howard that she knows Jimmy better than he does. Howard angrily replies that Chuck knew Jimmy better than anyone else. That evening, Kim tells Jimmy about her meeting with Howard and initially suggests continuing to harass him. Her idea evolves into a serious plan to sabotage Howard and force a resolution of the Sandpiper case, which will enable Jimmy to obtain his seven-figure share of the expected settlement sooner. Jimmy counsels against it, but Kim shows that she is serious about undermining Howard.

=== Season 6 ===
Jimmy and Kim begin plotting against Howard to force a settlement of the Sandpiper case. They use various tricks to make it appear to Cliff that Howard is using prostitutes and cocaine, leading Cliff to privately question Howard about his behavior. Howard realizes that Jimmy is behind these events and hires a private investigator to begin surveilling Jimmy. He later tells his estranged wife Cheryl he is attempting to solve Jimmy's harassment campaign. Jimmy and Kim fake photos to make it appear that the Sandpiper case mediator has taken cash from Jimmy and coat them in a skin-absorbent drug. Howard's investigator, who is actually working for Kim and Jimmy, delivers the photos to Howard just before the Sandpiper settlement conference. When Howard sees the mediator, he believes him to be the same individual seen in the photos and accuses him of accepting a bribe. When Howard attempts to retrieve the photos from his office to prove his allegation, he finds they have been switched for innocuous photos of Jimmy. Howard's erratic behavior causes the conference to end, and Howard and Cliff are compelled to settle the case for less than they expected. Howard pieces together the entire con and arrives at Kim's apartment to confront her and Jimmy. Lalo Salamanca unexpectedly arrives soon afterward and Kim implores Howard to leave immediately, but Lalo kills him with a gunshot to the head.

After Gus Fring kills Lalo, Howard is buried alongside him underneath the construction site of Gus's meth lab, but Mike Ehrmantraut first removes Howard's wedding ring, wallet, and shoes to use in making his death appear to be a suicide. Jimmy and Kim attend Howard's memorial at HHM, where Rich Schweikart reveals the firm is downsizing and rebranding. Cheryl is suspicious of the circumstances surrounding Howard's death, but Kim falsely claims she previously saw him snorting cocaine at work and suggests Cheryl was so inattentive she missed the signs of his supposed drug addiction, causing Cheryl to break down in tears. The next day, Kim leaves Jimmy after telling him she knew Lalo was alive before he arrived at their apartment and killed Howard, but kept it to herself for fear that Jimmy would end their plan to ruin Howard's reputation, which she enjoyed, but now regrets. She then leaves for Florida to work at a Sprinkler company. In 2010, Kim receives a rare call from Jimmy, who is on the run and hiding in Nebraska following the events of Breaking Bad. Kim tells Jimmy that he should turn himself in for his crimes, but this only angers Jimmy who sarcastically goads her into confessing about Howard's death, since everyone else involved with it and the resulting cover-up is now also dead. Kim takes his words seriously and returns to Albuquerque to give Cheryl an affidavit detailing the plot to sabotage Howard's reputation and the true circumstances of his death. Kim says she gave a copy to the district attorney's office, but likely will not face prosecution given the lack of evidence, lack of surviving witnesses (besides Jimmy, although she does not mention her call with him), and the absence of Howard's remains. Once Jimmy is arrested, he tries to use information about Howard's death to get his sentence reduced via a plea deal, only to be told that Kim has already confessed which surprises Jimmy. Jimmy later learns from Bill Oakley that Cheryl is considering filing a wrongful death lawsuit against Kim. In his final court appearance, Jimmy lures Kim there with lies about her involvement in Howard's death which he quickly retracts, as he just wanted her to be there. He then confesses to all his crimes including his role in Chuck's death and expresses great sadness over what happened to Howard, before receiving a life sentence.

== Reception ==
Fabian received critical acclaim for his portrayal of Howard, particularly in the final season, with many critics deeming him the most tragic character in Better Call Saul.
