= List of Better Call Saul episodes =

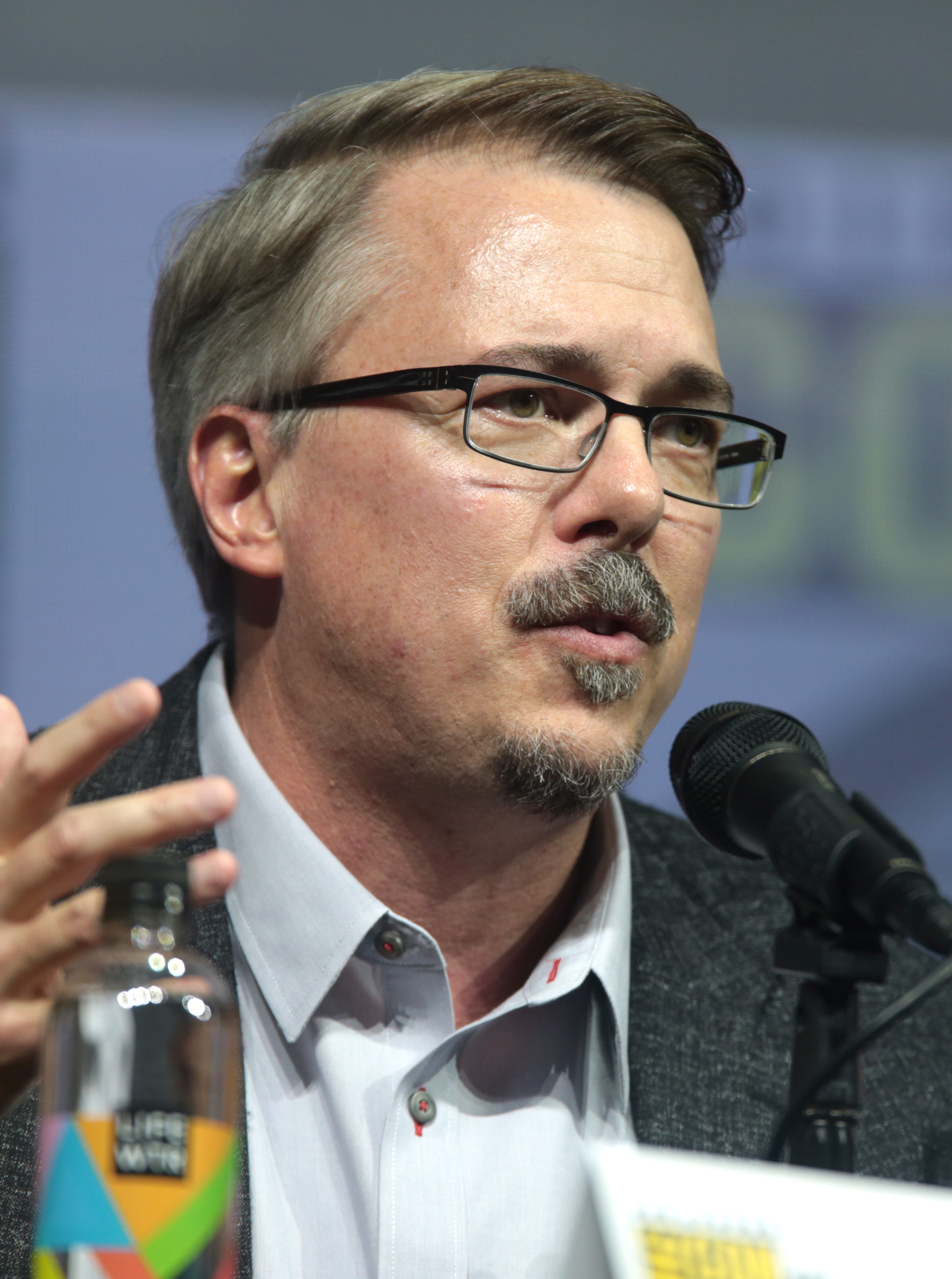
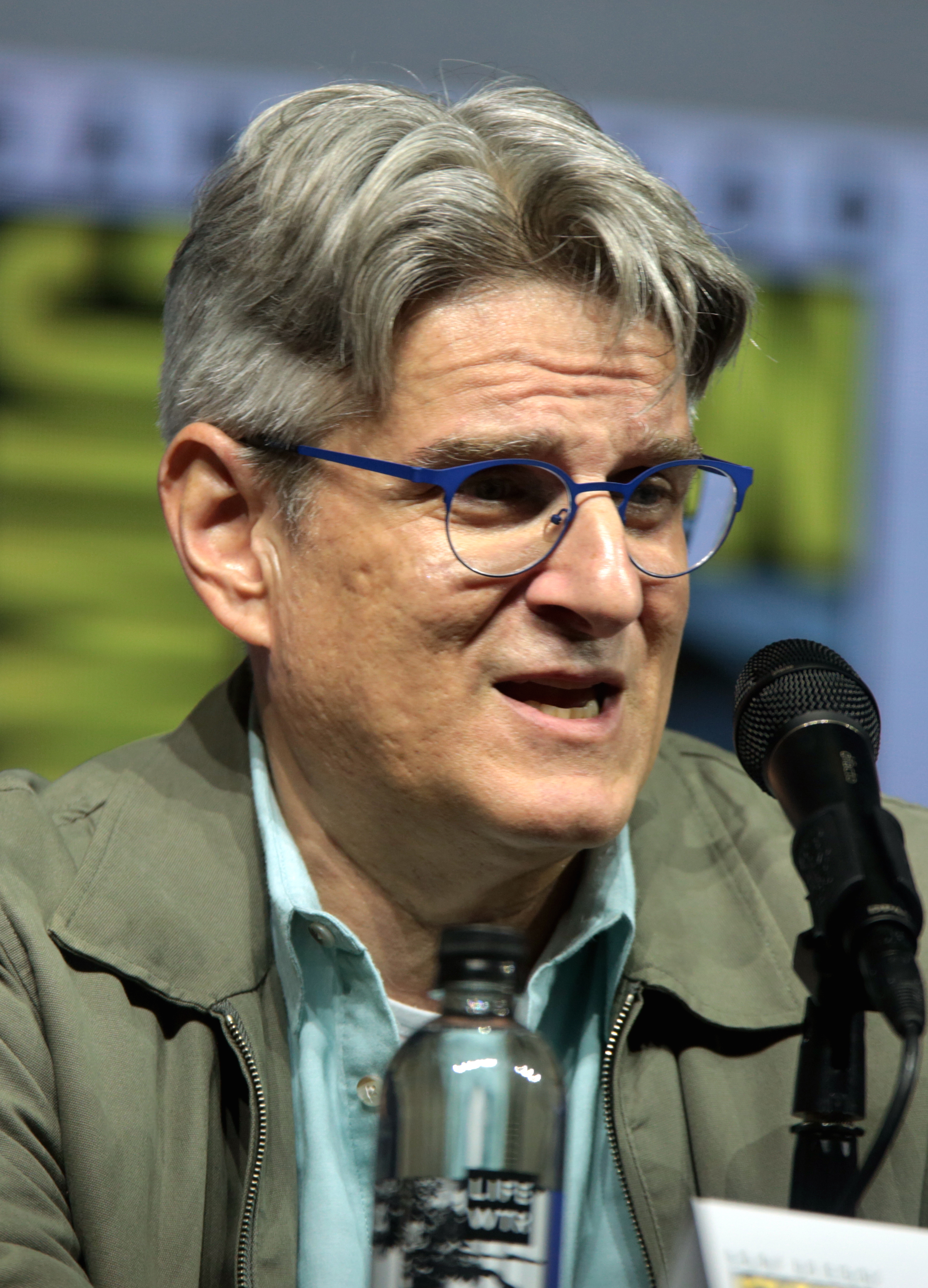
Better Call Saul was created by Vince Gilligan (left) and Peter Gould (right).

Better Call Saul is an American television drama series created by Vince Gilligan and Peter Gould that aired on AMC. It is a spin-off from Gilligan's previous series, Breaking Bad (2008–2013), to which it serves as both a prequel and sequel. Set primarily in the early 2000s in Albuquerque, New Mexico, the series follows Jimmy McGill (Bob Odenkirk), an earnest lawyer and former con artist, as he develops into an egocentric criminal defense attorney known as Saul Goodman. Also shown is the moral decline of former police officer Mike Ehrmantraut (Jonathan Banks), who becomes a fixer for drug traffickers to support his granddaughter and her widowed mother.

The series was officially greenlit in September 2013. In an interview Gilligan confirmed that the series would have a lighter tone than Breaking Bad. Before the premiere of the first season, a second season was ordered. The series premiere aired on February 8, 2015, and the first season concluded on April 6. The second season aired from February 15, 2016, through April 18. In March 2016, the series was renewed for another season. The third season began on April 10, 2017, and ended on June 19. A week later the series was renewed for an additional season. In July 2018, the series was renewed for a fifth season. The fourth season began airing on August 6, 2018, and ended on October 8. In January 2020, the show was renewed for a sixth and final season. The fifth season ran from February 23, 2020, through April 20. The sixth season was split into two parts; the first part ran from April 18, 2022, through May 23. The second part began on July 11, 2022, and the series finale aired on August 15.

During the course of the series, 63 episodes of Better Call Saul aired over six seasons.

== Series overview ==
Series overview for Better Call Saul
Season	Episodes		Originally released	
Season	Episodes		First released	Last released
1	10		February 8, 2015	April 6, 2015
2	10		February 15, 2016	April 18, 2016
3	10		April 10, 2017	June 19, 2017
4	10		August 6, 2018	October 8, 2018
5	10		February 23, 2020	April 20, 2020
6	13	7	April 18, 2022	May 23, 2022
6	13	6	July 11, 2022	August 15, 2022

== Episodes ==
=== Season 1 (2015) ===
The first season premiered on AMC on February 8, 2015, and ended on April 6. The season was planned to be released in 2014 but was delayed.

Better Call Saul season 1 episodes
No. overall	No. in season	Title	Directed by	Written by	Original release date	U.S. viewers (millions)
1	1	"Uno"	Vince Gilligan	Vince Gilligan & Peter Gould	February 8, 2015	6.88
2	2	"Mijo"	Michelle MacLaren	Peter Gould	February 9, 2015	3.42
3	3	"Nacho"	Terry McDonough	Thomas Schnauz	February 16, 2015	3.23
4	4	"Hero"	Colin Bucksey	Gennifer Hutchison	February 23, 2015	2.87
5	5	"Alpine Shepherd Boy"	Nicole Kassell	Bradley Paul	March 2, 2015	2.71
6	6	"Five-O"	Adam Bernstein	Gordon Smith	March 9, 2015	2.57
7	7	"Bingo"	Larysa Kondracki	Gennifer Hutchison	March 16, 2015	2.67
8	8	"RICO"	Colin Bucksey	Gordon Smith	March 23, 2015	2.87
9	9	"Pimento"	Thomas Schnauz	Thomas Schnauz	March 30, 2015	2.38
10	10	"Marco"	Peter Gould	Peter Gould	April 6, 2015	2.53

=== Season 2 (2016) ===
The second season aired from February 15, 2016, through April 18. A thirteen-episode second season was ordered before the release of season one. However, in November 2015, the season was reduced to 10 episodes.

Better Call Saul season 2 episodes
No. overall	No. in season	Title	Directed by	Written by	Original release date	U.S. viewers (millions)
11	1	"Switch"	Thomas Schnauz	Thomas Schnauz	February 15, 2016	2.57
12	2	"Cobbler"	Terry McDonough	Gennifer Hutchison	February 22, 2016	2.23
13	3	"Amarillo"	Scott Winant	Jonathan Glatzer	February 29, 2016	2.20
14	4	"Gloves Off"	Adam Bernstein	Gordon Smith	March 7, 2016	2.20
15	5	"Rebecca"	John Shiban	Ann Cherkis	March 14, 2016	1.99
16	6	"Bali Ha'i"	Michael Slovis	Gennifer Hutchison	March 21, 2016	2.11
17	7	"Inflatable"	Colin Bucksey	Gordon Smith	March 28, 2016	2.03
18	8	"Fifi"	Larysa Kondracki	Thomas Schnauz	April 4, 2016	1.93
19	9	"Nailed"	Peter Gould	Peter Gould	April 11, 2016	2.06
20	10	"Klick"	Vince Gilligan	Heather Marion & Vince Gilligan	April 18, 2016	2.26

=== Season 3 (2017) ===
The third season began on April 10, 2017, and ended on June 19.

Better Call Saul season 3 episodes
No. overall	No. in season	Title	Directed by	Written by	Original release date	U.S. viewers (millions)
21	1	"Mabel"	Vince Gilligan	Vince Gilligan & Peter Gould	April 10, 2017	1.81
22	2	"Witness"	Vince Gilligan	Thomas Schnauz	April 17, 2017	1.46
23	3	"Sunk Costs"	John Shiban	Gennifer Hutchison	April 24, 2017	1.52
24	4	"Sabrosito"	Thomas Schnauz	Jonathan Glatzer	May 1, 2017	1.56
25	5	"Chicanery"	Daniel Sackheim	Gordon Smith	May 8, 2017	1.76
26	6	"Off Brand"	Keith Gordon	Ann Cherkis	May 15, 2017	1.72
27	7	"Expenses"	Thomas Schnauz	Thomas Schnauz	May 22, 2017	1.65
28	8	"Slip"	Adam Bernstein	Heather Marion	June 5, 2017	1.63
29	9	"Fall"	Minkie Spiro	Gordon Smith	June 12, 2017	1.47
30	10	"Lantern"	Peter Gould	Gennifer Hutchison	June 19, 2017	1.85

=== Season 4 (2018) ===
The fourth season began airing on August 6, 2018, and ended on October 8.

Better Call Saul season 4 episodes
No. overall	No. in season	Title	Directed by	Written by	Original release date	U.S. viewers (millions)
31	1	"Smoke"	Minkie Spiro	Peter Gould	August 6, 2018	1.77
32	2	"Breathe"	Michelle MacLaren	Thomas Schnauz	August 13, 2018	1.55
33	3	"Something Beautiful"	Daniel Sackheim	Gordon Smith	August 20, 2018	1.51
34	4	"Talk"	John Shiban	Heather Marion	August 27, 2018	1.53
35	5	"Quite a Ride"	Michael Morris	Ann Cherkis	September 3, 2018	1.53
36	6	"Piñata"	Andrew Stanton	Gennifer Hutchison	September 10, 2018	1.40
37	7	"Something Stupid"	Deborah Chow	Alison Tatlock	September 17, 2018	1.35
38	8	"Coushatta"	Jim McKay	Gordon Smith	September 24, 2018	1.37
39	9	"Wiedersehen"	Vince Gilligan	Gennifer Hutchison	October 1, 2018	1.35
40	10	"Winner"	Adam Bernstein	Peter Gould & Thomas Schnauz	October 8, 2018	1.53

=== Season 5 (2020) ===
The fifth season ran from February 23, 2020, through April 20.

Better Call Saul season 5 episodes
No. overall	No. in season	Title	Directed by	Written by	Original release date	U.S. viewers (millions)
41	1	"Magic Man"	Bronwen Hughes	Peter Gould	February 23, 2020	1.60
42	2	"50% Off"	Norberto Barba	Alison Tatlock	February 24, 2020	1.06
43	3	"The Guy for This"	Michael Morris	Ann Cherkis	March 2, 2020	1.18
44	4	"Namaste"	Gordon Smith	Gordon Smith	March 9, 2020	1.22
45	5	"Dedicado a Max"	Jim McKay	Heather Marion	March 16, 2020	1.45
46	6	"Wexler v. Goodman"	Michael Morris	Thomas Schnauz	March 23, 2020	1.40
47	7	"JMM"	Melissa Bernstein	Alison Tatlock	March 30, 2020	1.30
48	8	"Bagman"	Vince Gilligan	Gordon Smith	April 6, 2020	1.42
49	9	"Bad Choice Road"	Thomas Schnauz	Thomas Schnauz	April 13, 2020	1.51
50	10	"Something Unforgivable"	Peter Gould	Peter Gould & Ariel Levine	April 20, 2020	1.59

=== Season 6 (2022) ===
The sixth season was split into two parts, the first part aired from April 18, 2022, through May 23. The second part began on July 11, and the series finale aired on August 15.

Better Call Saul season 6 episodes
No. overall	No. in season	Title	Directed by	Written by	Original release date	U.S. viewers (millions)
Part One
51	1	"Wine and Roses"	Michael Morris	Peter Gould	April 18, 2022	1.42
52	2	"Carrot and Stick"	Vince Gilligan	Thomas Schnauz & Ariel Levine	April 18, 2022	1.16
53	3	"Rock and Hard Place"	Gordon Smith	Gordon Smith	April 25, 2022	1.16
54	4	"Hit and Run"	Rhea Seehorn	Ann Cherkis	May 2, 2022	1.16
55	5	"Black and Blue"	Melissa Bernstein	Alison Tatlock	May 9, 2022	1.22
56	6	"Axe and Grind"	Giancarlo Esposito	Ariel Levine	May 16, 2022	1.13
57	7	"Plan and Execution"	Thomas Schnauz	Thomas Schnauz	May 23, 2022	1.19
Part Two
58	8	"Point and Shoot"	Vince Gilligan	Gordon Smith	July 11, 2022	1.16
59	9	"Fun and Games"	Michael Morris	Ann Cherkis	July 18, 2022	1.22
60	10	"Nippy"	Michelle MacLaren	Alison Tatlock	July 25, 2022	1.20
61	11	"Breaking Bad"	Thomas Schnauz	Thomas Schnauz	August 1, 2022	1.34
62	12	"Waterworks"	Vince Gilligan	Vince Gilligan	August 8, 2022	1.32
63	13	"Saul Gone"	Peter Gould	Peter Gould	August 15, 2022	1.80

== Ratings ==
Ratings of AMC cable TV viewers in the United States. Ratings do not include AMC+ and Netflix viewers.

Better Call Saul : U.S. viewers per episode (millions)

Season	Episode number													Average
Season	1	2	3	4	5	6	7	8	9	10	11	12	13	Average
1	6.88	3.42	3.23	2.87	2.71	2.57	2.67	2.87	2.38	2.53	–			3.21
2	2.57	2.23	2.20	2.20	1.99	2.11	2.03	1.93	2.06	2.26	–			2.16
3	1.81	1.46	1.52	1.56	1.76	1.72	1.65	1.63	1.47	1.85	–			1.64
4	1.77	1.55	1.51	1.53	1.53	1.40	1.35	1.37	1.35	1.53	–			1.49
5	1.60	1.06	1.18	1.22	1.45	1.40	1.30	1.42	1.51	1.59	–			1.37
6	1.42	1.16	1.16	1.16	1.22	1.13	1.19	1.16	1.22	1.20	1.34	1.32	1.80	1.27

Audience measurement performed by Nielsen Media Research

== See also ==
- List of Breaking Bad episodes
- List of awards and nominations received by Better Call Saul
