= Better Call Saul season 1 =

First season of the AMC crime drama television series

Better Call Saul
- Season 1
- Home media cover art
- Showrunners: Vince Gilligan; Peter Gould
- Starring: Bob Odenkirk; Jonathan Banks; Rhea Seehorn; Patrick Fabian; Michael Mando; Michael McKean
- No. of episodes: 10

Release
- Original network: AMC
- Original release: February 8 – April 6, 2015

Season chronology
- Next → Season 2

The first season of the American television drama series Better Call Saul premiered on February 8, 2015, and concluded on April 6, 2015. The ten-episode season was broadcast on Monday nights in the United States on AMC, excluding the first episode which aired on a Sunday. A spin-off of Breaking Bad, Better Call Saul was created by Vince Gilligan and Peter Gould, both of whom also worked on Breaking Bad.

The season takes place in 2002, six years prior to the events in Breaking Bad, and features Bob Odenkirk reprising his role as James Morgan "Jimmy" McGill, known in Breaking Bad as Saul Goodman. Jimmy is a struggling lawyer looking after his successful brother Chuck, a former attorney. Jonathan Banks also reprises his role as Mike Ehrmantraut, a parking lot attendant who is also a criminal.

The series premiere, "Uno" became the biggest in cable history at the time, drawing in 4.4 million and 4 million in the 18–49 and 25–54 demographics, respectively, and received an overall viewership of 6.88 million. The first season of Better Call Saul received critical acclaim, with many considering it to be a worthy successor to Breaking Bad, and received six nominations for the 67th Primetime Emmy Awards, including Outstanding Drama Series.

== Cast and characters ==
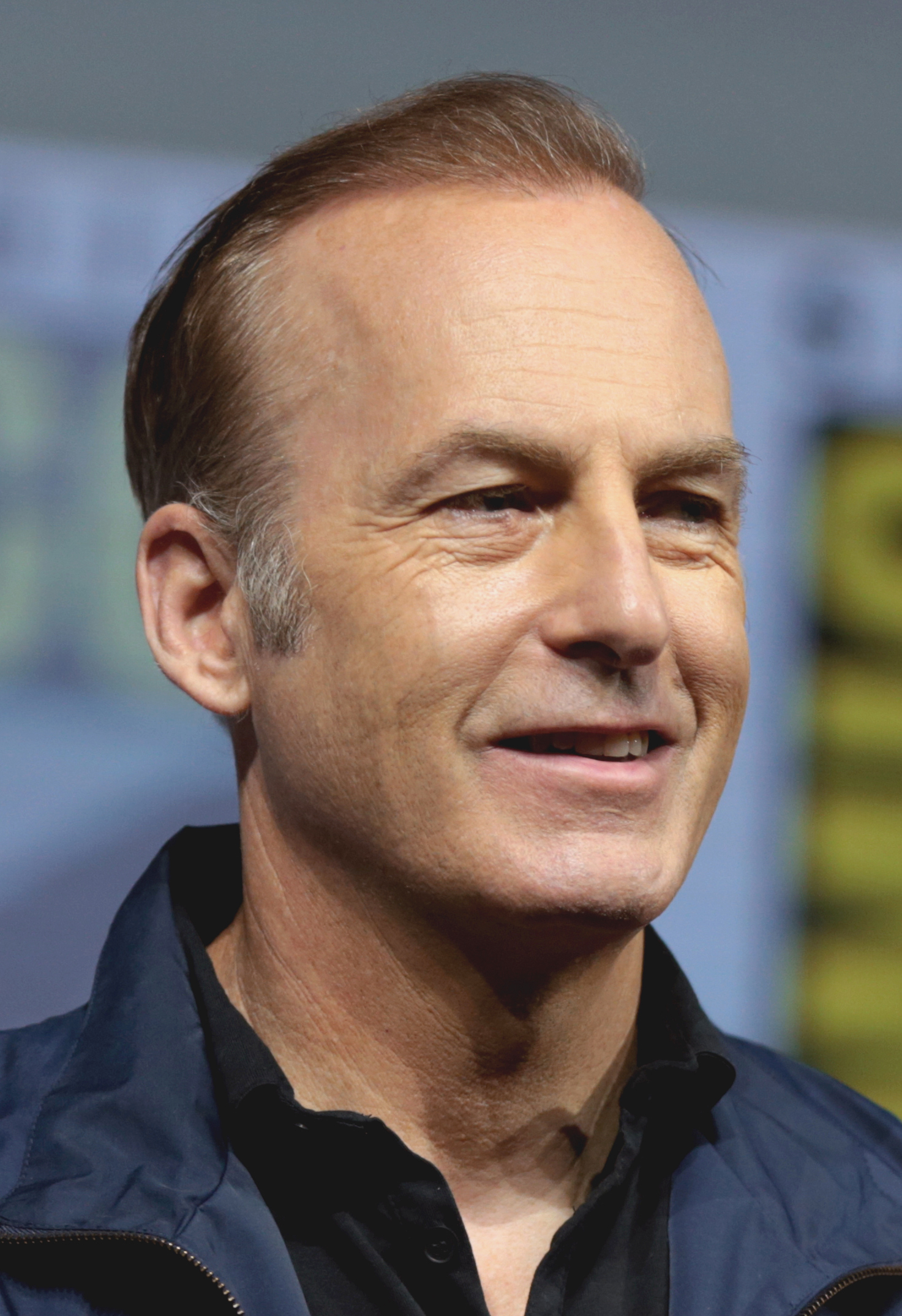
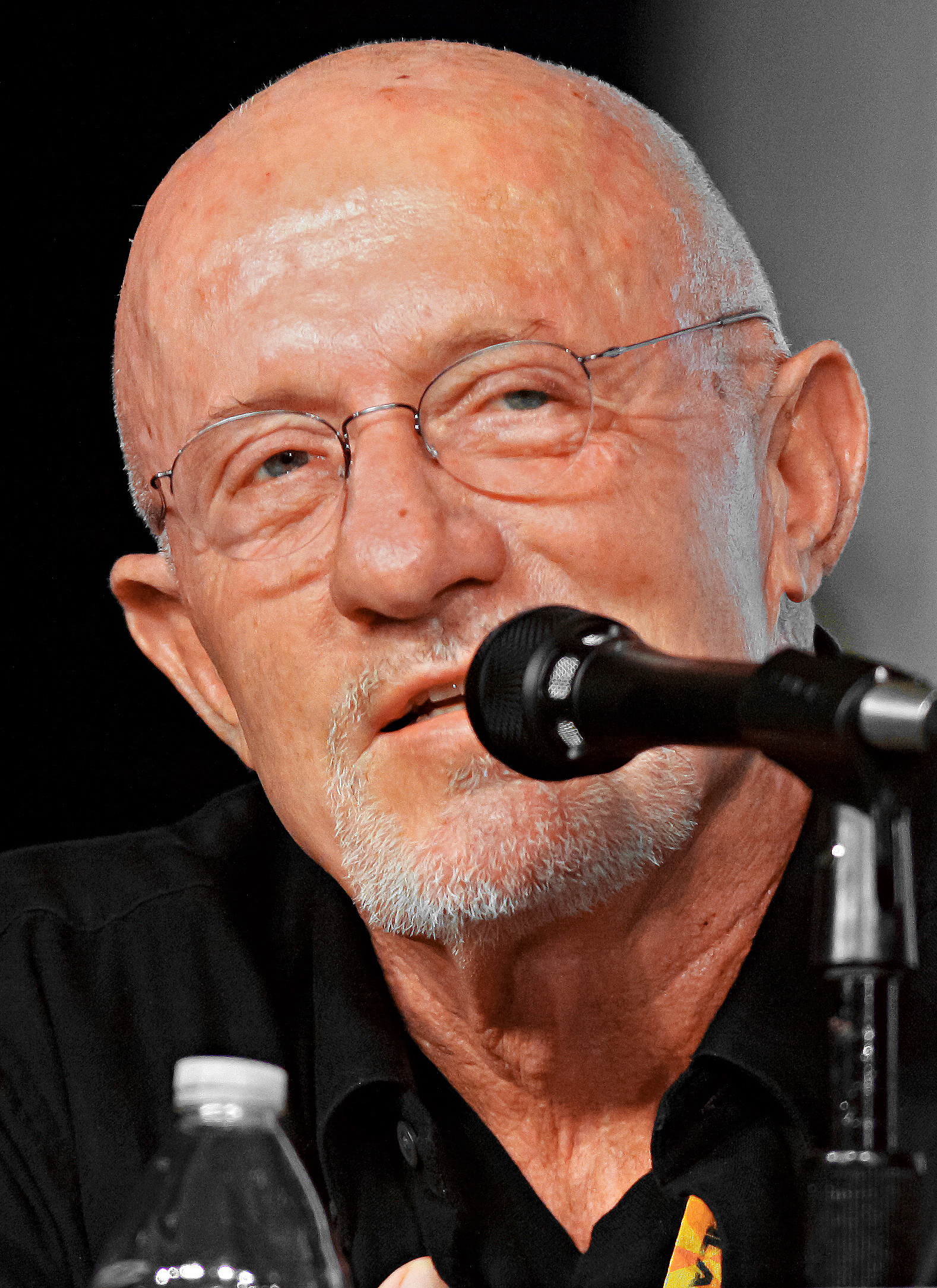
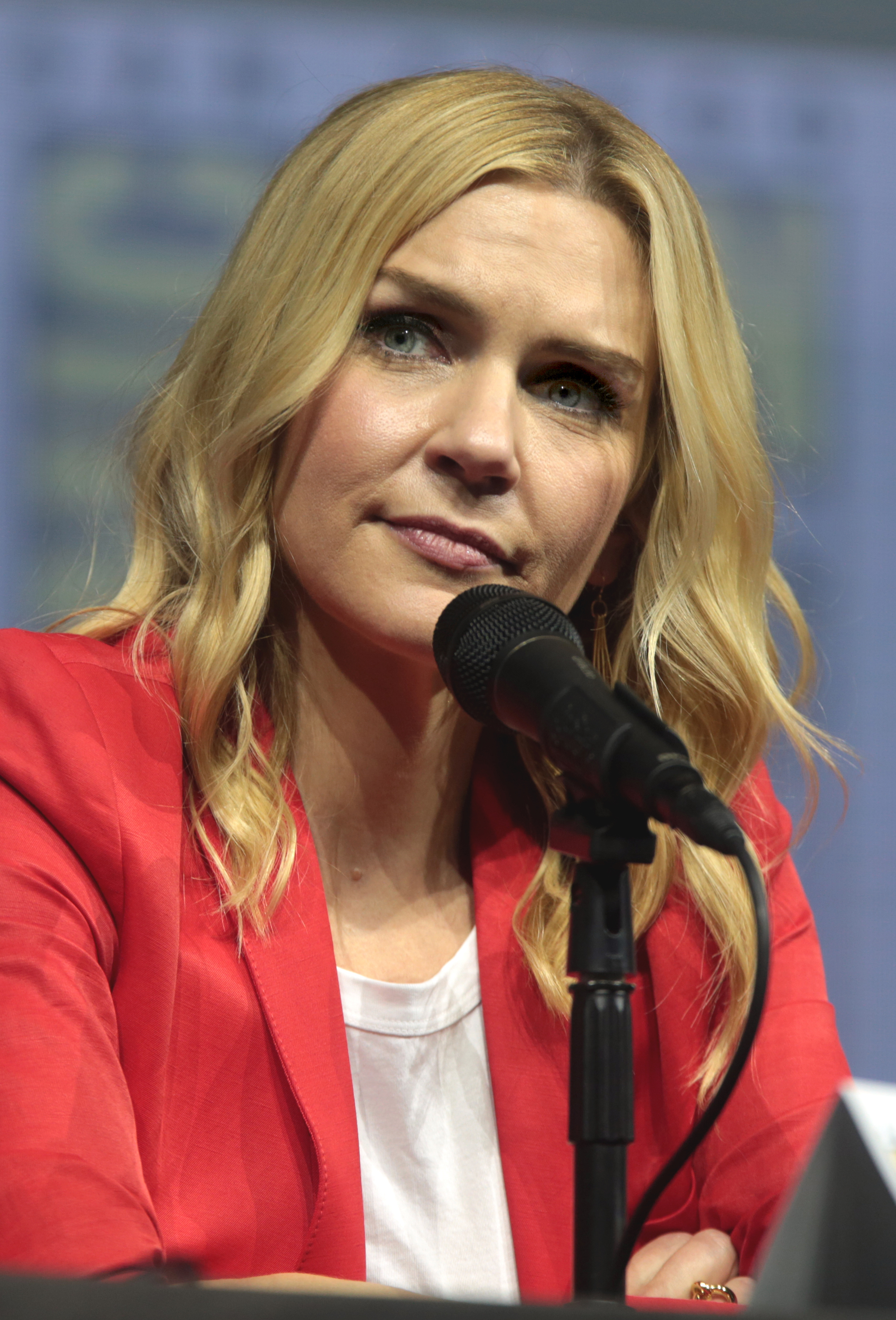
Bob Odenkirk (Jimmy McGill), Jonathan Banks (Mike Ehrmantraut), and Rhea Seehorn (Kim Wexler)
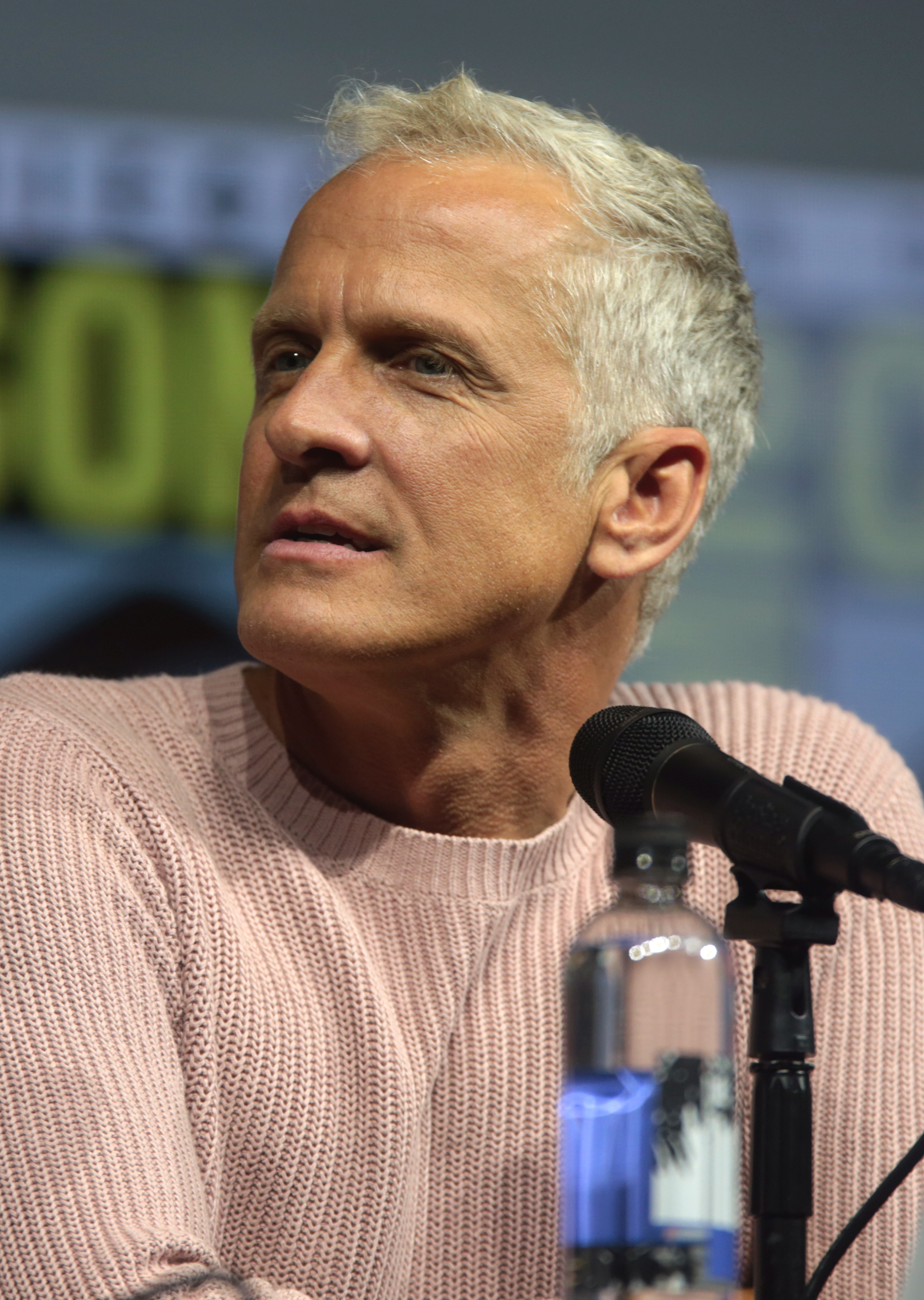
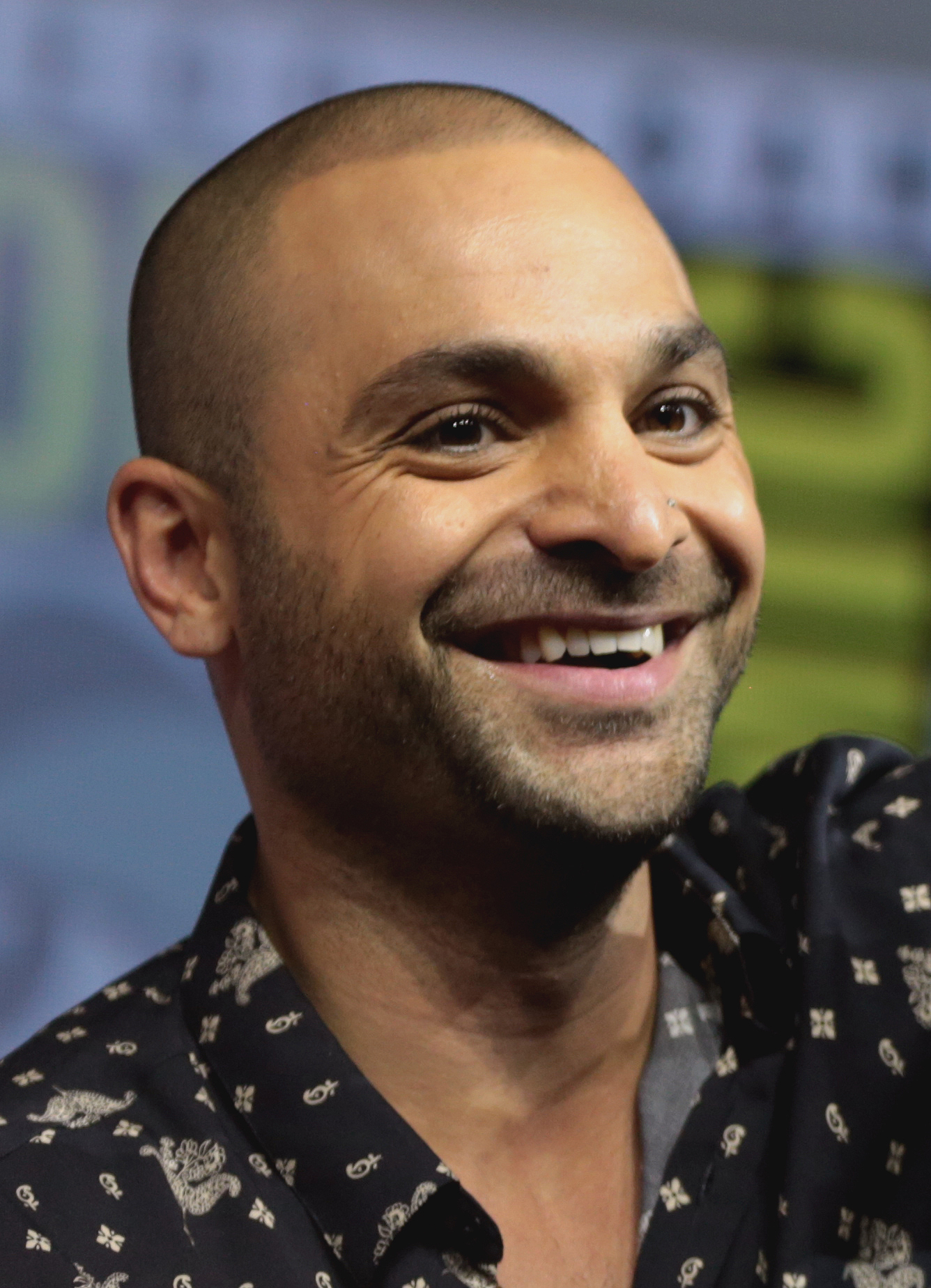
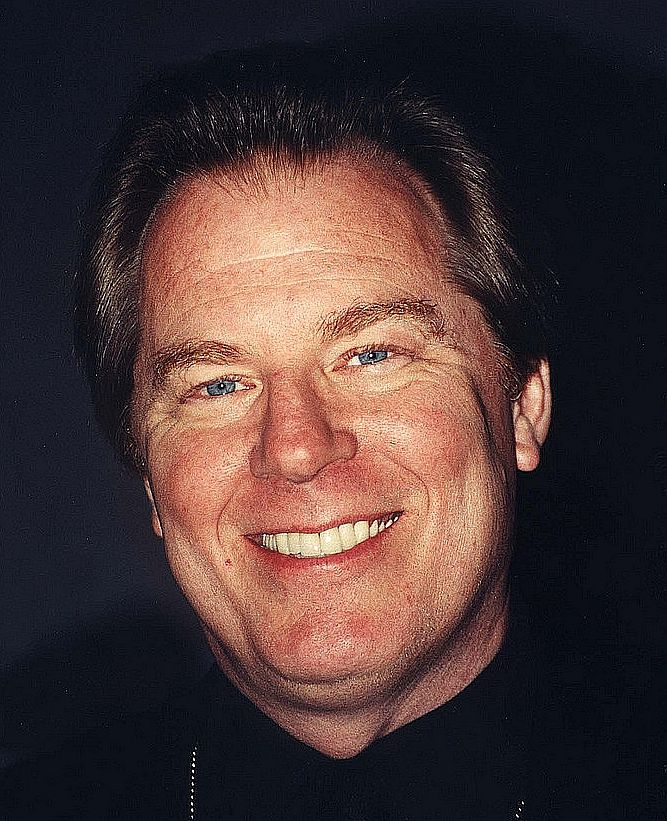
Patrick Fabian (Howard Hamlin), Michael Mando (Nacho Varga), and Michael McKean (Chuck McGill)

=== Main ===
- Bob Odenkirk as Jimmy McGill, a struggling lawyer, who is looking after his brother Chuck. In the present, he manages a Cinnabon store in Omaha under the alias Gene Takavic.
- Jonathan Banks as Mike Ehrmantraut, a parking lot attendant who is also a criminal.
- Rhea Seehorn as Kim Wexler, Jimmy's close friend and lover who is an attorney at Hamlin, Hamlin & McGill.
- Patrick Fabian as Howard Hamlin, Chuck's law partner at Hamlin, Hamlin & McGill, and Jimmy's rival.
- Michael Mando as Nacho Varga, a criminal associate of Tuco and a member of the Salamanca family's gang.
- Michael McKean as Chuck McGill, Jimmy's elder brother, a name partner at Hamlin, Hamlin & McGill who claims to suffer from electromagnetic hypersensitivity.

=== Recurring ===
- Jeremy Shamos as Craig Kettleman, a county treasurer accused of embezzlement.
- Julie Ann Emery as Betsy Kettleman, Craig's wife, also accused of embezzlement.
- Kerry Condon as Stacey Ehrmantraut, Mike's widowed daughter-in-law and the mother of Kaylee Ehrmantraut.
- Faith Healey as Kaylee Ehrmantraut, Mike's granddaughter.
- Eileen Fogarty as Mrs. Nguyen, owner of a nail salon that houses Jimmy's law office (and home) in its back room.
- Peter Diseth as Bill Oakley, a deputy district attorney.
- Barry Shabaka Henley as Detective Greg Sanders, a Philadelphia cop who was formerly partnered with Mike on the force.
- Omid Abtahi as Detective Geoff Abbasi, a Philadelphia cop and Sanders' partner.
- Joe DeRosa as Dr. Caldera, a veterinarian who serves as Mike Ehrmantraut's liaison to the criminal underworld.
- Dennis Boutsikaris as Rich Schweikart, the attorney for Sandpiper Crossing
- Brandon K. Hampton as Ernesto, Chuck's assistant who works at Hamlin, Hamlin & McGill.
- Steven Levine and Daniel Spenser Levine as Lars and Cal Lindholm, twin skateboarders and small-time scam artists.
- Mel Rodriguez as Marco Pasternak, Jimmy's best friend and partner-in-crime in Cicero, Illinois.
- Jean Effron as Irene Landry, an elderly client of Jimmy McGill overcharged by Sandpiper Crossing

=== Guest stars ===
- Raymond Cruz as Tuco Salamanca, a ruthless, psychopathic drug distributor in the South Valley who works with Nacho Varga.
- Míriam Colón as Abuelita Salamanca, Tuco's grandmother and Hector's mother.
- Cesar García as No-Doze, Tuco's henchman.
- Jesús Payán Jr. as Gonzo, Tuco's henchman.
- Josh Fadem as Joey Dixon, a film student that helps Jimmy film various projects.
- Julian Bonfiglio as Sound Guy, a film student that helps Jimmy film various projects.
- Mark Proksch as Daniel "Pryce" Wormald, a small-time drug dealer who hires Mike as security.
- Steven Ogg as Sobchak, a criminal Pryce hires for security along with Mike.
- Clea DuVall as Dr. Cruz, a doctor who treats Chuck.

== Production ==
=== Development ===
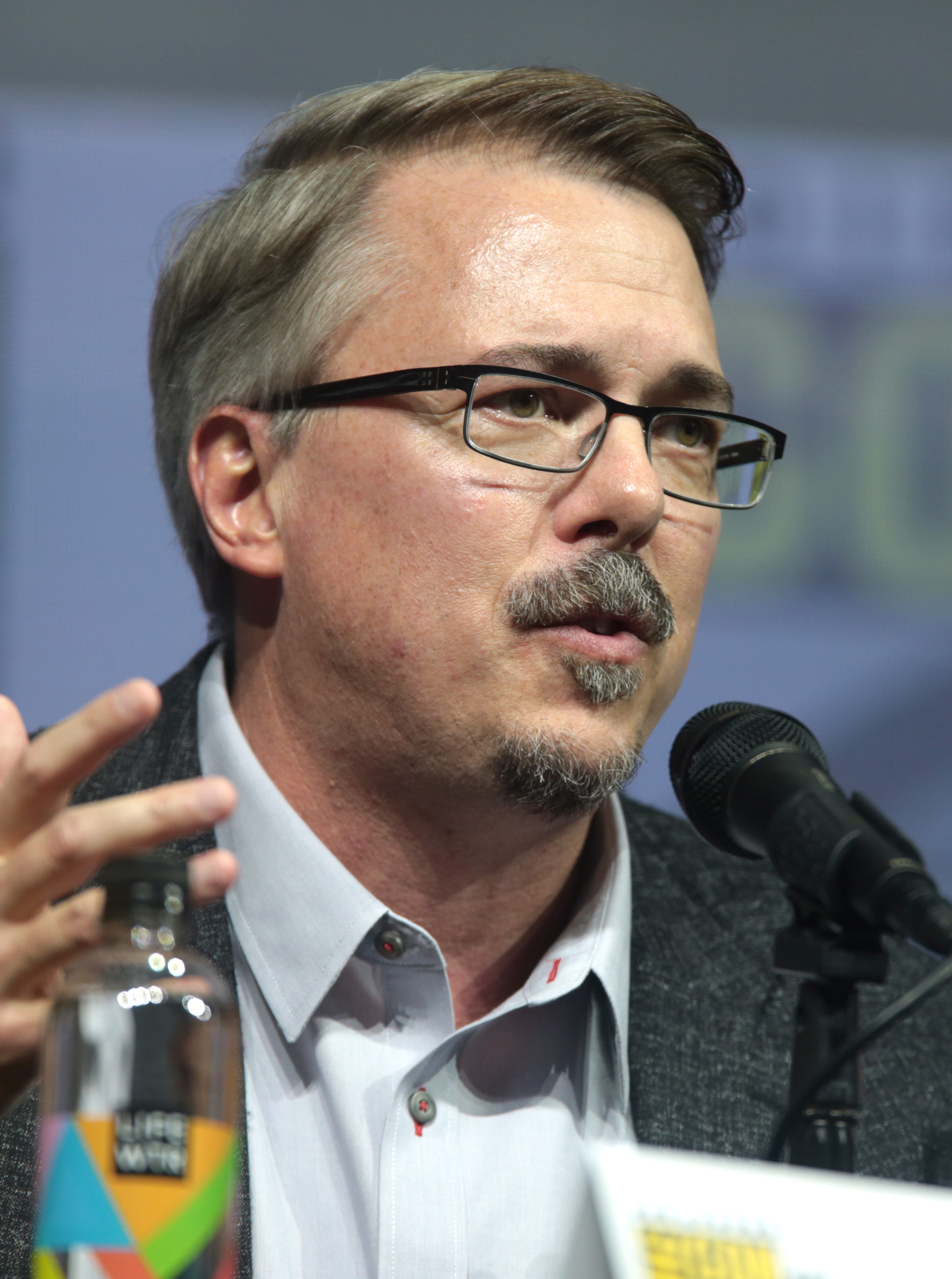
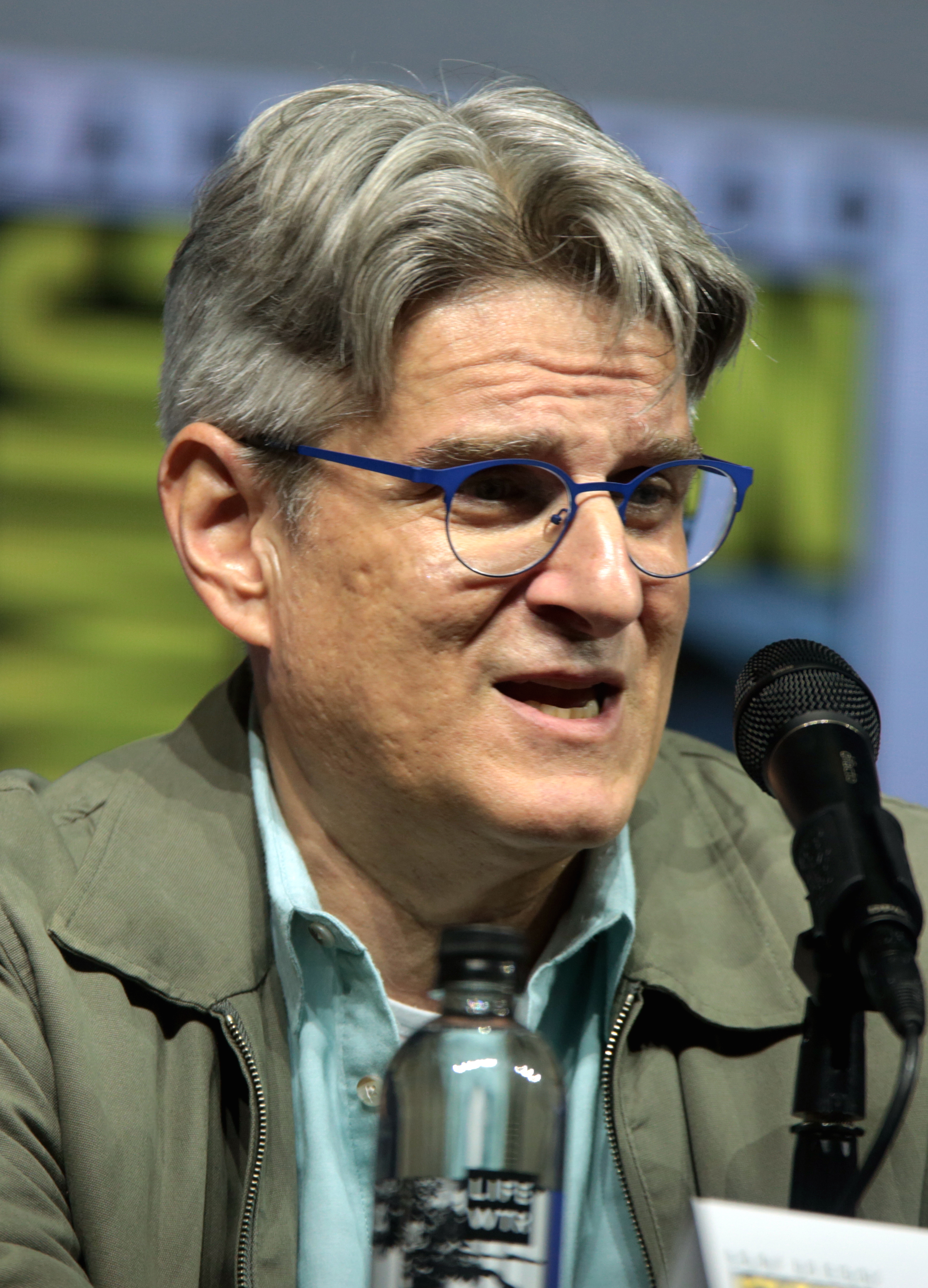
Better Call Saul was co-created by Vince Gilligan (left) and Peter Gould (right). Gilligan was the creator of Breaking Bad and Gould wrote the episode that first introduced Saul Goodman.

Better Call Saul is a spin-off of Breaking Bad, a crime drama television series created and produced by Vince Gilligan that aired on AMC from 2008 to 2013, consisting of five seasons. Gilligan and Peter Gould began planning a spin-off of Breaking Bad as early as 2009. While filming the Breaking Bad episode "Full Measure", Gilligan asked Bob Odenkirk, the actor of Saul Goodman, what he thought of a spinoff of the show. In July 2012, Gilligan hinted at a possible Goodman spinoff, stating that he liked "the idea of a lawyer show in which the main lawyer will do anything it takes to stay out of a court of law", including settling on the courthouse steps. During his appearance on Talking Bad, Odenkirk noted that Saul was one of the most popular characters on the show, speculating that the audience likes the character because he is "the program's least hypocritical figure", and "is good at his job".

By July 2013, the series had yet to be greenlit. Netflix was one of many interested distributors, but ultimately a deal was made between AMC and Breaking Bad production company Sony Pictures Television. Gilligan and Gould would serve as co-showrunners and Gilligan directed the first episode. Former Breaking Bad writers Thomas Schnauz and Gennifer Hutchison joined the writing staff, with Schnauz serving as co-executive producer and Hutchison as supervising producer. Also on the writing staff are Bradley Paul, and Gordon Smith, who worked on Breaking Bad as a writer's assistant.

=== Casting ===
Bob Odenkirk stars as lawyer/con-man Jimmy McGill (originally known as Saul Goodman in Breaking Bad). In January 2014, it was announced that Jonathan Banks would reprise his Breaking Bad role as Mike Ehrmantraut and be a series regular.

Dean Norris, who played Hank Schrader in Breaking Bad, announced that he would not make an appearance, partly due to his involvement in the CBS series Under the Dome. Anna Gunn, who played Skyler White, also mentioned a "talk" with Gilligan over possible guest appearances.

Michael McKean was cast as McGill's elder brother Chuck. McKean had previously worked for Vince Gilligan as the recurring character Morris Fletcher first shown in The X-Files episode "Dreamland", and the two had kept in touch since about potential projects, though during that time, much of McKean's work was in New York City for Broadway theatre while Gilligan was in Los Angeles for television and could not work anything out. When Gilligan had contacted McKean about acting in Better Call Saul, McKean accepted the role just knowing the bare minimum on Chuck's electromagnetic sensitivity, having been both a fan of Breaking Bad and trusting Gilligan. When filming of Better Call Saul started in 2014, McKean had to initially split his time between that and performing in All the Way, a Broadway play that coincidentally also starred Bryan Cranston, who had played Walter White from Breaking Bad. When McKean's casting had been announced in April 2014, he had been deliberately misnamed to play a character called "Dr. Thurber", which McKean says was based on humorist James Thurber. Chuck's real name – Charles Lindbergh McGill – was inspired by the aviator Charles Lindbergh.

In May 2014, Patrick Fabian was cast in Better Call Saul, with E! Online describing his character as a "Kennedy-esque lawyer who's winning at life". Though initially reported as Burt, the character's name was later revealed as Howard Hamlin. Rhea Seehorn auditioned and got the role of Kim Wexler in April 2014, about two months before the first episode was shot. According to casting director Sharon Bialy, they had used two fake scenes to keep the high-profile project a secret, and when Seehorn auditioned and impressed them with both scenes, only then did they go to the next step and explain the audition's true purpose. Seehorn was able to adapt to this change to the role of Kim in a single take. Michael Mando was initially cast as Eddie, described by E! Online as a "smart and calculating criminal". Mando said that he had been approached through his agent from Better Call Saul's casting directors about being in the show. After sending in an audition tape, he was flown to Los Angeles to meet with showrunners Vince Gilligan and Peter Gould and perform a screen test. For Mando, he said it was "love at first sight" in working with the pair in how well they provided direction and feedback and was notified about getting the part a few weeks later. The character was first mentioned in the Breaking Bad episode "Better Call Saul".

In October 2014, Kerry Condon was cast as Stacey Ehrmantraut, Mike's widowed daughter-in-law. In November 2014, it was announced that Julie Ann Emery and Jeremy Shamos had been cast as Betsy and Craig Kettleman, described as "the world's squarest outlaws."

=== Filming ===
Like its predecessor, Better Call Saul is set and filmed in Albuquerque, New Mexico. As filming began on June 2, 2014, Gilligan told The Hollywood Reporter that he was skeptical about the show's success, revealing production was almost two weeks behind schedule for the first season. The first season was planned to be released in 2014 but was ultimately delayed. Filming concluded by October 2014.

In the first scene from the first episode, Saul (now hiding his real identity under the Gene Takavic alias), is working at a Nebraska Cinnabon. This scene in the premiere is set in Omaha, but it was filmed in Albuquerque, New Mexico, at the Cottonwood Mall.

In December 2020, Odenkirk said that filming the first season had a negative impact on his health as he had to be in almost every scene, with little time to memorize his lines and even less to remember them, which proved overwhelming for him.

== Episodes ==
Better Call Saul season 1 episodes
No. overall	No. in season	Title	Directed by	Written by	Original release date	U.S. viewers (millions)
1	1	"Uno"	Vince Gilligan	Vince Gilligan & Peter Gould	February 8, 2015	6.88
Following the events of Breaking Bad, Saul Goodman lives as "Gene Takavic," manager of a Cinnabon in Omaha, Nebraska. After work, he watches a VHS tape of a 2005 Saul Goodman TV ad. In 2002, Jimmy McGill (Saul's birth name) is a struggling public defender in Albuquerque, New Mexico. He attempts to convince Craig and Betsy Kettleman, who are accused of embezzlement, to retain him. Jimmy cares for his brother Chuck, who is semi-reclusive and believes he has electromagnetic hypersensitivity. Jimmy also confronts Howard Hamlin of Hamlin, Hamlin & McGill (HHM) when Howard attempts to buy Chuck out with a token payment, demanding that HHM pay Chuck for his partnership's full value. The Kettlemans hire HHM, so Jimmy orchestrates a phony vehicle-pedestrian accident involving Betsy, in hopes of getting another opportunity to win her over. Jimmy's accomplices, twins Lars and Cal, accidentally target the wrong car, which is driven by an elderly woman whom they follow into her house. Jimmy arrives soon after and is pulled into the house at gunpoint by Tuco Salamanca.
2	2	"Mijo"	Michelle MacLaren	Peter Gould	February 9, 2015	3.42
Jimmy learns that the elderly woman was Tuco's abuelita (grandmother) and he kidnapped Cal and Lars for insulting her. Jimmy attempts to explain about the mistake, only for Lars to immediately implicate Jimmy. Tuco and his associates take Jimmy and the twins to a remote desert site. Jimmy informs Tuco that he is a lawyer and one of his associates, Nacho Varga, convinces Tuco that killing a lawyer would bring unwanted attention. Jimmy then manages to persuade Tuco from not killing the twins and to show mercy by breaking one leg each; he later rushes them to the hospital. A few days later, Nacho tells Jimmy he wants to steal the $1.6 million the Kettlemans embezzled, for which he will pay Jimmy a finder's fee. Jimmy declines, telling Nacho he is not a criminal. Nacho leaves his phone number, advising Jimmy to call when he realizes that he is "in the game".
3	3	"Nacho"	Terry McDonough	Thomas Schnauz	February 16, 2015	3.23
In a flashback, Jimmy is jailed in Cicero, Illinois, facing multiple charges and sex offender status for a scatological "Chicago Sunroof" revenge prank. Chuck agrees to defend Jimmy if Jimmy agrees to cease running cons and move to Albuquerque to work a legitimate job. In 2002, Jimmy still hopes to represent the Kettlemans and notices Nacho conducting surveillance of their home from his van. Disguising his voice, Jimmy calls from a pay phone to warn them of the impending theft. The next day, Jimmy learns that the Kettlemans have been kidnapped, with Nacho arrested as a person of interest. Nacho accuses Jimmy of setting him up and threatens to kill him unless he proves his innocence. Jimmy comes to believe that the Kettlemans staged their own kidnapping, and based on advice from Mike Ehrmantraut, Jimmy finds them hiding in the nearby hills along with the embezzled $1.6 million.
4	4	"Hero"	Colin Bucksey	Gennifer Hutchison	February 23, 2015	2.87
In a flashback to Cicero, Jimmy and his partner in crime, Marco, use a fake Rolex watch to con a bar patron. In 2002, the Kettlemans agree to return home and pay Jimmy $30,000 to ignore their stolen funds. Jimmy gets an embittered Nacho released from jail. He then uses his ill-gotten gains to compete with HHM by creating a billboard that mimics HHM's logo and Howard's signature look. This results in a cease and desist order and Jimmy is required to remove the advertisement. In an attempt to generate sympathetic media coverage, he fakes the rescue of the worker who is removing the billboard. To Howard's annoyance, Jimmy's scam generates positive local news coverage and new clients. Jimmy hides the scam from Chuck, but he learns of it after taking his neighbor's newspaper.
5	5	"Alpine Shepherd Boy"	Nicole Kassell	Bradley Paul	March 2, 2015	2.71
Chuck's neighbor reports him for taking her newspaper, and due to his living conditions causing the police to believe he is producing meth, they kick in his door and tase him. Chuck is hospitalized, and the doctor, believing that his "disease" is psychosomatic, wants to have him committed, but Jimmy declines. Jimmy's newfound fame attracts less than promising clients. Among them is an elderly woman who he helps prepare her will; her bequests consisting almost entirely of leaving her Hummel figurines to various friends and family members. Jimmy's rapport with her leads his colleague Kim Wexler to suggest that he specialize in elder law. Jimmy begins promoting himself at a nursing home, wearing clothes like the fictional TV lawyer Matlock. Meanwhile, Mike is visited at home by several Philadelphia police officers.
6	6	"Five-O"	Adam Bernstein	Gordon Smith	March 9, 2015	2.57
In a flashback a few months prior, Mike arrives in Albuquerque and visits Dr. Caldera, a veterinarian, to have his wounded shoulder treated. In 2002, Mike is at the police station, requests Jimmy as counsel, and asks him to spill coffee as a diversion so Mike can steal a detective's notebook. Mike learns that his daughter-in-law, Stacey, called the police after she found money her husband Matt hid in a suitcase. Mike reveals to Stacey that Matt was a clean cop in a precinct of corruption that included Mike. Mike counseled him to participate for his own safety, but Matt's partner and another cop killed him for fear that he might turn them in. In another flashback, Mike manipulates the two cops into confirming they were the ones who killed Matt. They attempt to kill him, but he kills them, and is wounded in the process.
7	7	"Bingo"	Larysa Kondracki	Gennifer Hutchison	March 16, 2015	2.67
Jimmy and Mike return the detective's notebook. The two Philadelphia detectives are unsatisfied with their explanation, though one privately tells Mike he has nothing to fear from their investigation. Jimmy finds Chuck standing outside his home, claiming he is building up a tolerance to electromagnetic waves. He stores legal documents at Chuck's house as part of a plan to pique Chuck's interest in cases, hoping to get him back into practicing law. Jimmy asks Kim to join him in a law partnership, but she declines, citing her loyalty to HHM. The Kettlemans fire HHM and hire Jimmy after Kim tries to convince them to accept a plea bargain that includes jail time for Craig. Jimmy also attempts to persuade them, but Betsy blackmails him, pointing out that the "retainer" the Kettlemans paid could be considered a bribe. Jimmy later discovers that Kim has been demoted to the document review office because she lost the Kettlemans as clients. Together, Mike and Jimmy steal the embezzled money from the Kettlemans. Jimmy returns the bribe/retainer money to the stolen funds and gives everything to the prosecutors, compelling Craig to accept the plea bargain to keep Betsy out of jail.
8	8	"RICO"	Colin Bucksey	Gordon Smith	March 23, 2015	2.87
In a flashback to before 2002, Jimmy is working in the HHM mailroom and passionately celebrates with Kim over passing his bar exam results. Jimmy shows Chuck his results and explains that he studied law at the University of American Samoa via distance learning. Chuck tells Jimmy he is proud of him, however later Howard tells Jimmy that HHM will not hire him as an attorney. In 2002, Jimmy continues to work in elder law. While assisting a resident of the Sandpiper Crossing home with her will, Jimmy discovers that the company overcharges residents for expenses. After speaking to several other residents, Jimmy suspects elder abuse and presents a hastily written demand letter warning Sandpiper against destroying evidence. He is escorted from the facility but can hear the staff shredding documents, so he searches the dumpster and finds the shreds. Jimmy and Chuck put the pieces together and recover an incriminating document. Realizing the potential of the case as a class action lawsuit, Chuck agrees to aid Jimmy. In the excitement, Chuck goes to Jimmy's car for more documents and is shocked to realize he went outside without suffering any electromagnetic hypersensitivity symptoms.
9	9	"Pimento"	Thomas Schnauz	Thomas Schnauz	March 30, 2015	2.38
Sandpiper Crossing buries Jimmy and Chuck in paperwork, and Chuck convinces Jimmy the case is too big for them, so they bring it to HHM. Howard is eager to take it but makes clear Jimmy will not continue to participate, offering instead a small of counsel fee and a percentage of the settlement or judgment; Jimmy angrily refuses. Later, Jimmy discovers Chuck braved his electromagnetic hypersensitivity symptoms to make a pre-meeting phone call to Howard, in which he asked Howard to prevent Jimmy's participation. Chuck admits he has never regarded Jimmy as a peer, owing to his conman's past and unconventional legal training, also admitting it was he who insisted HHM not hire Jimmy back when he passed the bar exam. Jimmy decides to stop taking care of Chuck and allows HHM to take the case. Meanwhile, to make more money for Stacey and Kaylee, Mike takes a job as a bodyguard for pharmaceutical employee Daniel Wormald, who sells Nacho stolen pills. Despite Wormald's inexperience and nervousness, Mike ensures the deal goes well.
10	10	"Marco"	Peter Gould	Peter Gould	April 6, 2015	2.53
In a flashback, Jimmy says goodbye to Marco in Cicero, explaining that as part of Chuck's work to get him out of jail, he has agreed to take a legitimate job in Albuquerque. In 2002, Jimmy has a breakdown while calling bingo at the senior center due to Chuck's betrayal, and returns to Cicero, where he reminisces with Marco. Jimmy's agreement to do a con with Marco leads to a week of scams, which ends after Marco suddenly dies. Kim calls Jimmy to say the Sandpiper case is so big that HHM intends to work with Davis & Main of Santa Fe. D&M's partners know Jimmy has a good rapport with the elderly clients, so they want to hire him. Jimmy returns to Albuquerque to meet with them but hesitates and then drives out of the courthouse parking lot. He questions Mike why they didn't keep the Kettleman money, which Mike recalls that Jimmy wanted to do the "right thing". Jimmy assures Mike that he will not make that mistake again and drives off.

== Release ==
The first teaser trailer debuted on AMC on August 10, 2014, and confirmed its premiere date of February 2015. On November 20, 2014, AMC announced the series would have a two-night premiere; the first episode aired on Sunday, February 8, 2015, at 10:00 pm (ET), and then moved into its regular time slot the following night, airing new episodes Mondays at 10:00 pm until the season concluded on April 6, 2015.

=== International broadcasting ===
In December 2013, Netflix announced that the entire first season would be available for streaming in the United States and Canada after the airing of the first-season finale, and in Latin America and Europe each episode will be available a few days after the episode airs in the U.S. In Australia, Better Call Saul premiered on the streaming service Stan on February 9, 2015, acting as the service's flagship program. In the United Kingdom and the Republic of Ireland, the series was acquired by Netflix on December 16, 2013 and the first episode premiered on February 9, 2015, with the second episode scheduled for release the following day. Every subsequent episode was uploaded each week thereafter.

=== Home media ===
The first season was released on Blu-ray and DVD in Region 1 on November 10, 2015. The set contains all 10 episodes, plus audio commentaries for every episode, uncensored episodes, deleted scenes, gag reel, and several behind-the-scenes featurettes. A limited edition Blu-ray set was also released with 3D packaging and a postcard vinyl of the Better Call Saul theme song by Junior Brown.

== Reception ==
=== Critical response ===
Better Call Saul season 1: Critical reception by episode
Season 1 (2015): Percentage of positive critics' reviews tracked by the website Rotten Tomatoes

Better Call Saul exceeded critics expectations, earning critical acclaim, with many critics calling it a worthy successor to Breaking Bad. On Rotten Tomatoes, the first season has a rating of 97%, based on 291 reviews, with an average rating of 8.10/10. The site's critical consensus reads, "Better Call Saul is a quirky, dark character study that manages to stand on its own without being overshadowed by the series that spawned it." On the review aggregator website Metacritic, the first season has a score of 78 out of 100, based on 43 critics, indicating "generally favorable" reviews.

In his review of the two-episode premiere, Hank Stuever of The Washington Post graded it a "B+" and wrote the series "is right in line with the tone and style of the original, now-classic series", and that it "raises more questions in two hours than it will readily answer". Stephen Marche of Esquire wrote that the first few episodes were better than those of Breaking Bad. Kirsten Acuna of Business Insider declared the initial episodes "everything you could possibly want from a spinoff television series". Alessandra Stanley of The New York Times wrote, "Better Call Saul is better than good: It's delightful – in a brutal, darkly comic way, of course." Vulture writer Eric Konigsberg noted the show was special as it was "the first spinoff of this golden age of premium cable." Brian Tallerico of RogerEbert.com gave the first season a positive review, saying, "Better Call Saul is not only a great show in the context of the program that birthed it into existence, but would be a great show with or without Walter White."

The episode "Five-O" received near universal acclaim, with unanimous praise for Jonathan Banks' performance, with some critics considering it award-worthy. Roth Cornet of IGN gave it a score of 9.7 out of 10, praising the performance of Banks, the episode's pacing and interwoven storylines, as well as the final scene of the episode. She concluded, "Better Call Saul continues to deliver some of the best of what television has to offer as both those familiar with Breaking Bad and new viewers alike were given a shattering look at Mike's tragic past." Tim Surette of TV.com also highly praised the performance of Banks, and wrote that it was worthy of an Emmy, calling it "one of the best episodes to date of 2015's best new show to date". The episode received three Primetime Emmy Award nominations. Banks was nominated for the Outstanding Supporting Actor in a Drama Series, Gordon Smith was nominated for Outstanding Writing for a Drama Series, and Kelley Dixon was nominated for Outstanding Single-Camera Picture Editing for a Drama Series. When Peter Dinklage won for Outstanding Supporting Actor, he praised the other nominees, and singled out Banks by name.

==== Critics' top ten list ====
2015
- No. 1 NPR (Fresh Air)
- No. 3 RogerEbert.com
- No. 3 Uproxx
- No. 3 USA Today
- No. 4 The A.V. Club
- No. 4 TV Guide
- No. 5 TheWrap (Amber Dowling)
- No. 6 IndieWire (Kate Erbland)
- No. 6 Entertainment Weekly (Melissa Maerz)
- No. 9 Rolling Stone
- No. 9 TV Insider
- – Variety (Brian Lowry)

=== Ratings ===
The series premiere, "Uno" became the biggest in cable history, drawing in 4.4 million and 4 million in the 18–49 and 25–54 demographics, respectively, and received an overall viewership of 6.88 million.

Viewership and ratings per episode of Better Call Saul season 1
No.	Title	Air date	Rating (18–49)	Viewers (millions)	DVR (18–49)	DVR viewers (millions)	Total (18–49)	Total viewers (millions)
1	"Uno"	February 8, 2015	3.4	6.88	—N/a	—N/a	—N/a	—N/a
2	"Mijo"	February 9, 2015	1.6	3.42	—N/a	—N/a	—N/a	—N/a
3	"Nacho"	February 16, 2015	1.6	3.23	—N/a	—N/a	—N/a	—N/a
4	"Hero"	February 23, 2015	1.4	2.87	—N/a	—N/a	—N/a	—N/a
5	"Alpine Shepherd Boy"	March 2, 2015	1.2	2.71	1.4	2.80	2.6	5.51^{a}
6	"Five-O"	March 9, 2015	1.3	2.57	—N/a	—N/a	—N/a	—N/a
7	"Bingo"	March 16, 2015	1.3	2.67	—N/a	—N/a	—N/a	—N/a
8	"RICO"	March 23, 2015	1.3	2.87	1.6	2.97	2.9	5.84
9	"Pimento"	March 30, 2015	1.1	2.38	—N/a	—N/a	—N/a	—N/a
10	"Marco"	April 6, 2015	1.2	2.53	1.6	3.23	2.8	5.76

^a Live +7 ratings were not available, so Live +3 ratings have been used instead.

== Accolades ==
Accolades received by Better Call Saul, season 1
Ceremony	Category	Recipients	Result
2015 American Film Institute Awards	Television Programs of the Year	Better Call Saul	Won
5th Critics' Choice Television Awards	Best Actor in a Drama Series	Bob Odenkirk	Won
5th Critics' Choice Television Awards	Best Supporting Actor in a Drama Series	Jonathan Banks	Won
31st TCA Awards	Outstanding New Program	Better Call Saul	Won
31st TCA Awards	Individual Achievement in Drama	Bob Odenkirk	Nominated
67th Primetime Emmy Awards	Outstanding Drama Series	Better Call Saul	Nominated
67th Primetime Emmy Awards	Outstanding Lead Actor in a Drama Series	Bob Odenkirk	Nominated
67th Primetime Emmy Awards	Outstanding Supporting Actor in a Drama Series	Jonathan Banks	Nominated
67th Primetime Emmy Awards	Outstanding Writing for a Drama Series	Gordon Smith ("Five-O")	Nominated
67th Primetime Creative Arts Emmy Awards	Outstanding Single-Camera Picture Editing for a Drama Series	Kelley Dixon ("Five-O")	Nominated
67th Primetime Creative Arts Emmy Awards	Outstanding Single-Camera Picture Editing for a Drama Series	Kelley Dixon and Chris McCaleb ("Marco")	Nominated
67th Primetime Creative Arts Emmy Awards	Outstanding Sound Mixing for a Comedy or Drama Series	Phillip W. Palmer, Larry Benjamin, Kevin Valentine ("Marco")	Nominated
20th Satellite Awards	Best Drama Series	Better Call Saul	Won
20th Satellite Awards	Best Actor in a Drama Series	Bob Odenkirk	Nominated
20th Satellite Awards	Best Supporting Actor in a Series, Miniseries or TV Film	Jonathan Banks	Nominated
20th Satellite Awards	Best Supporting Actress in a Series, Miniseries or TV Film	Rhea Seehorn	Won
68th Writers Guild of America Awards	Drama Series	Better Call Saul	Nominated
68th Writers Guild of America Awards	New Series	Better Call Saul	Nominated
68th Writers Guild of America Awards	Episodic Drama	Vince Gilligan and Peter Gould ("Uno")	Won
22nd Screen Actors Guild Awards	Outstanding Performance by a Male Actor in a Drama Series	Bob Odenkirk	Nominated
73rd Golden Globe Awards	Best Actor – Television Series Drama	Bob Odenkirk	Nominated

== Related media ==
=== Better Call Saul: Client Development ===
AMC released a digital comic book for Better Call Saul titled Better Call Saul: Client Development in February 2015, in advance of the series premiere, which details the history of Saul and Mike, acting as a spin-off of the Breaking Bad episode "Better Call Saul" that introduced Saul. This would later be retconned by the Better Call Saul episode "Breaking Bad".
