= Bingo (Better Call Saul) =

- Better Call Saul episode
- Episode no.: Season 1 Episode 7
- Directed by: Larysa Kondracki
- Written by: Gennifer Hutchison
- Editing by: Skip Macdonald
- Original air date: March 16, 2015
- Running time: 47 minutes

Guest appearances
- Julie Ann Emery as Betsy Kettleman; Jeremy Shamos as Craig Kettleman; Barry Shabaka Henley as Detective Greg Sanders; Omid Abtahi as Detective Abbasi; Jean Effron as Irene Landry; Caleb Burgess as Warren Kettleman; Sage Bell as Jo Jo Kettleman

Episode chronology
← Previous "Five-O"	Next → "RICO"
- Better Call Saul season 1

"Bingo" is the seventh episode of the first season of the AMC television series Better Call Saul, the spinoff series of Breaking Bad. The episode aired on March 16, 2015 on AMC in the United States. Outside of the United States, the episode premiered on streaming service Netflix in several countries.

== Plot ==
Jimmy McGill and Mike Ehrmantraut return Abbasi's notebook, (Note: As seen in "Five-O".) claiming they found it in the police station parking lot. Despite Abbasi's accusations, Sanders privately assures Mike he has little to fear. Jimmy finds Chuck McGill standing outside his home, claiming to be building up a tolerance to electromagnetism. Jimmy stores his case files at Chuck's house, hoping to rekindle Chuck's enthusiasm for the law. He later brings Kim Wexler to an office suite he is considering renting and asks her to be his partner. She turns him down because of her loyalty to HHM.

Kim meets with Betsy and Craig Kettleman and proposes a plea deal that includes the return of the embezzled $1.6 million and 16 months in prison for Craig. Since losing a trial would mean 30 years in prison, she recommends that Craig accept. Betsy refuses, maintaining Craig's innocence and denying there is any money to return. The Kettlemans fire Kim and hire Jimmy, who initially urges them to accept the plea bargain. Betsy blackmails Jimmy by pointing out that the "retainer" the Kettlemans paid him (Note: As seen in "Hero".) implicates him in their crime. While picking up records from HHM, Jimmy discovers Kim has been demoted as a result of losing the Kettlemans as clients.

Jimmy enlists Mike's help, and Mike sprays a fluorescent liquid on cash taken from Jimmy's bribe, which he plants outside the Kettleman house. The Kettlemans find it, assume it came from the embezzled money, and add it to the rest of the cash in their hiding place. Mike breaks in and uses a blacklight to trace the money to a false bottom in a bathroom cabinet. He leaves with the cash, and after Jimmy returns (and repays) his "retainer" money, he has Mike deliver it to the district attorney. Mike tells Jimmy that completing this task satisfies the debt he owes for Jimmy's aid in stealing Abbasi's notebook.

The next day, Jimmy visits the Kettlemans. When they discover the money missing, Betsy again threatens to reveal that Jimmy is also guilty. Jimmy replies that if she does, she will be guilty of a crime for bribing him. If Betsy and Craig are both convicted, the Kettleman children will grow up without parents. The Kettlemans agree to accept Kim's plea deal, deciding that only one parent going to prison is their best option. Knowing he is now unable to afford a new workspace, a frustrated Jimmy returns to his prospective office to vent his anger.

== Production ==
This was the second episode written by supervising producer Gennifer Hutchison for the series. It was directed by Larysa Kondracki.

== Reception ==
Upon airing, the episode received 2.67 million American viewers, and an 18–49 rating of 1.3.

The episode received a generally positive reception from critics. On Rotten Tomatoes, based on 24 reviews, it received a 92% approval rating with an average score of 7.69 out of 10. The site's consensus reads, "A more low-key episode than the heart-wrenching one that came before, 'Bingo' feels like a turning point in Jimmy's ongoing quest to be a better person." IGN gave the episode an 8.8 rating. The Telegraph rated the episode 4 out of 5 stars.
