= RICO (Better Call Saul) =

- Better Call Saul episode
- Episode no.: Season 1 Episode 8
- Directed by: Colin Bucksey
- Written by: Gordon Smith
- Original air date: March 23, 2015
- Running time: 47 minutes

Guest appearances
- Kerry Condon as Stacey Ehrmantraut; Dennis Boutsikaris as Richard Schweikart; Jillian Armenante as Paula; Joe DeRosa as Dr. Caldera; Jean Effron as Irene Landry; Marty Lindsey as Alvin Reese; John Christian Love as Ernesto; Faith Healey as Kaylee Ehrmantraut

Episode chronology
← Previous "Bingo"	Next → "Pimento"
- Better Call Saul season 1

"RICO" is the eighth episode of the first season of the AMC television series Better Call Saul, the spinoff series of Breaking Bad. The episode aired on March 23, 2015 on AMC in the United States. Outside of the United States, the episode premiered on streaming service Netflix in several countries. It is named after the Racketeer Influenced and Corrupt Organizations (RICO) Act.

== Plot ==
=== Opening ===
In a flashback, Jimmy McGill is working in the mail room at Hamlin, Hamlin & McGill when he receives notice that he has passed the state bar exam. He tells Chuck, hoping to be hired as an attorney, but Chuck seems unenthusiastic. Later, Howard Hamlin tells Jimmy the firm will not hire him, but he promises to re-examine his application in six months.

=== Main story ===
Jimmy is suspicious when a client mentions that her nursing home, Sandpiper Crossing, controls her pension and Social Security payments while only providing her a monthly allowance. Upon reviewing her invoices, Jimmy's suspicions grow and he begins collecting invoices from other residents. Jimmy and Chuck analyze them and find evidence of Sandpiper systematically overcharging residents, making the company guilty of fraud. Chuck suggests there are grounds for a class action lawsuit and encourages Jimmy to continue investigating.

Jimmy is stopped at Sandpiper Crossing's front desk, preventing him from seeing clients. He hears papers being shredded and goes to a bathroom to hastily write on toilet paper a demand letter for Sandpiper to stop destroying evidence. He hands the letter to a manager as he is escorted out. That night, Jimmy looks through the retirement home's dumpsters for shredded papers. Chuck and Jimmy sort through the shreds and piece together an incriminating document. Chuck decides to become Jimmy's co-counsel, and Sandpiper's attorneys agree to a meeting.

Mike Ehrmantraut babysits Kaylee; Stacey asks Mike what to do with the money from her suitcase, (Note: During "Five-O".) and he says she should use it to do something good for herself and her daughter. Stacey says that even if she does, she will not have enough to cover living expenses. Mike returns to Dr. Caldera to follow up on his previous offer of illegal work.

Sandpiper's attorneys deny the company is defrauding residents, but concede some were overcharged. The company offers $100,000 in compensation, but Jimmy presents evidence that Sandpiper's fraud makes them eligible for a RICO case. Chuck demands Sandpiper pay $20 million to settle, which their attorneys refuse. As Chuck and Jimmy continue to prepare their case, a preoccupied Chuck casually leaves his house to retrieve documents from Jimmy's car, taking none of his usual EHS precautions. Jimmy is speechless as he watches from inside the front door, then softly calls Chuck's name. Chuck is stunned to realize where he is and drops the papers.

== Production ==
This was the second episode written by Gordon Smith and directed by Colin Bucksey.

== Reception ==
Upon airing, the episode received 2.87 million American viewers, and an 18-49 rating of 1.3.

The episode received a generally positive reception from critics. On Rotten Tomatoes, based on 23 reviews, it received a 96% approval rating with an average score of 7.97 out of 10. The site's consensus reads, "'RICO' introduces an intriguing fraud case while providing insightful backstory to Jimmy's unlikely beginnings as a lawyer." Roth Cornet of IGN gave the episode an 8.8 rating, concluding, "With 'RICO', Better Call Saul lays the foundation for the circumstances that will likely transform sweet(ish) Jimmy McGill into the hardened Saul Goodman." The Telegraph rated the episode 4 out of 5 stars.
