= Bali Ha'i (Better Call Saul) =

- Better Call Saul episode
- Episode no.: Season 2 Episode 6
- Directed by: Michael Slovis
- Written by: Gennifer Hutchison
- Original air date: March 21, 2016
- Running time: 46 minutes

Guest appearances
- Dennis Boutsikaris as Rich Schweikart; Jessie Ennis as Erin Brill; Rex Linn as Kevin Wachtell; Omar Maskati as Omar; Eileen Fogarty as Mrs. Nguyen; Cara Pifko as Paige Novick; Steven Flynn as Dale Gibson; Vincent Fuentes as Arturo Colon; Abigail Zoe Lewis as Kaylee Ehrmantraut; Marty Lindsey as Alvin Reese; Luis Moncada as Marco Salamanca; Daniel Moncada as Leonel Salamanca; Mark Margolis as Hector Salamanca

Episode chronology
← Previous "Rebecca"	Next → "Inflatable"
- Better Call Saul season 2

"Bali Ha'i" is the sixth episode of the second season of the American television drama series Better Call Saul, the spinoff series of Breaking Bad. Written by Gennifer Hutchison and directed by Breaking Bad cinematographer Michael Slovis, "Bali Ha'i" aired on AMC in the United States on March 21, 2016. Outside of the United States, the episode premiered on streaming service Netflix in several countries.

== Plot ==
Jimmy McGill finds it difficult to adjust to his new job at D&M. Unable to sleep in his apartment, he returns to his old boiler room office, where he has no trouble falling asleep. The next morning, Jimmy leaves Kim Wexler a voicemail in which he happily sings "Bali Ha'i" from South Pacific. With Chuck McGill's help, Kim is transferred out of HHM's document review room, but is treated coldly by Howard Hamlin, who gives her humiliating and menial assignments, including arguing unwinnable motions in court.

Kim is approached by Rich Schweikart of Schweikart & Cokely, who tells her he was impressed with her performance while arguing a motion she was sure to lose. He offers her a position at S&C that will include better pay and benefits and the promise of meaningful work. Unsure of what to do, Kim relieves her stress by running another con with Jimmy. They fool an investor into giving them $10,000 before spending the night together, though the next morning Kim tells Jimmy they will not cash the check, but keep it as a "souvenir". She confides her doubts about whether to move to S&C and expresses jealousy that Jimmy always seems to know what he wants. Though he is increasingly frustrated at D&M, Jimmy lies to Kim and says working there is everything he always wanted.

Mike Ehrmantraut refuses Hector Salamanca's offer of $5,000 to say the gun found when Tuco Salamanca assaulted him is his own, so Hector sends his henchmen to scare Mike into complying. When that fails, he has his nephews Leonel and Marco Salamanca (the Cousins) threaten the lives of Stacey and Kaylee. Mike then agrees to take responsibility for the gun, but only if he is paid $50,000. Hector agrees, and Mike later gives $25,000 to Nacho Varga to reimburse him for the money Nacho paid to get Tuco arrested. When Nacho questions the payment, Mike argues that Tuco's reduced sentence means Mike did not live up to the terms of their agreement.

== Reception ==
=== Ratings ===
Upon airing, the episode received 2.11 million American viewers, and an 18–49 rating of 0.9.

=== Critical reception ===
The episode received very positive reviews from critics. It holds a perfect 100% positive rating with an average score of 8.38 out of 10 on the review aggregator site Rotten Tomatoes. The critics' consensus reads: "Bali Ha'i," with a calm-before-the-storm approach, subtly shows nuanced character performance work while brilliantly eliminating trusted tropes and providing a desired focus on Kim and Mike.

Terri Schwartz of IGN gave the episode an 8.3 rating, writing "The Cousins are back as Hector Salamanca makes things personal for Mike."

For this episode, Jonathan Banks was nominated for Outstanding Supporting Actor in a Drama Series at the 68th Primetime Emmy Awards.
