= Nacho (Better Call Saul episode) =

- Better Call Saul episode
- Episode no.: Season 1 Episode 3
- Directed by: Terry McDonough
- Written by: Thomas Schnauz
- Editing by: Skip Macdonald
- Original air date: February 16, 2015
- Running time: 47 minutes

Guest appearances
- Julie Ann Emery as Betsy Kettleman; Jeremy Shamos as Craig Kettleman; Dorian Missick as Detective Dunst; Vincent Laresca as Detective Russo; Peter Diseth as DDA Bill Oakley; Caleb Burgess as Warren Kettleman; Sage Bell as Jo Jo Kettleman

Episode chronology
← Previous "Mijo"	Next → "Hero"
- Better Call Saul season 1

"Nacho" is the third episode of the first season of the AMC television series Better Call Saul, the spinoff series of Breaking Bad. The episode aired on February 16, 2015 and lasted 45 minutes and 12 seconds, on AMC in the United States. Outside of the United States, the episode premiered on streaming service Netflix in several countries.

In the episode, Jimmy McGill (Bob Odenkirk) is worried about cartel member Nacho Varga (Michael Mando)'s plan to steal more than a million dollars from the house of Bernalillo County treasurer, Craig Kettleman (Jeremy Shamos). The next day, the Kettleman family is missing, and the police arrest Nacho on suspicion of kidnapping them. Jimmy, working as Nacho's lawyer, is threatened to find the Kettlemans by the end of the day, or else the cartel will kill him. Jimmy gets into a fight with the county courthouse's ticket clerk, Mike Ehrmantraut (Jonathan Banks). Mike agrees with police to press charges against Jimmy, but eventually rescinds, giving Jimmy advice that the Kettlemans are likely in the vicinity of their home.

== Plot ==
=== Opening ===
In a flashback to 1992, Chuck McGill visits his younger brother Jimmy McGill in the Cook County Jail, where Jimmy is incarcerated for an offense that could result in him having to register as a sex offender. Chuck agrees to represent Jimmy on the condition that he stop running cons and find legitimate employment in Albuquerque.

=== Main story ===
In the present, Jimmy is anxious about Nacho Varga's plot to steal from the Kettlemans. (Note: As seen in "Mijo".) He calls Kim Wexler, who represents the Kettlemans, and indirectly warns her about the potential danger, but then breaks off the call, insisting he is "no hero". Later that night, Jimmy calls the Kettlemans anonymously and warns them. The Kettlemans observe someone surveilling them from a parked van.

The next morning, Kim tells Jimmy something has happened to the Kettlemans. He rushes to their house, which is surrounded by police, and finds that the family is missing. Believing Nacho has kidnapped them, Jimmy tries unsuccessfully to reach him by phone. Jimmy is picked up by the police, who tell him they have arrested Nacho and that he has requested Jimmy as his lawyer.

Nacho is suspicious Jimmy ratted on him and admits that he surveilled the Kettlemans but denies kidnapping them, warning that if Jimmy does not get the charges dropped, Nacho will have him killed. Jimmy is unsuccessful at persuading the police to release Nacho but convinces Kim to take him to the Kettleman house so he can investigate. Jimmy notices some inconsistencies, such as a missing child's doll, and theorizes that the Kettlemans staged their kidnapping. Jimmy tells Kim he warned the Kettlemans about Nacho, which probably drove them into hiding.

At the courthouse, Jimmy starts a fight with Mike Ehrmantraut, who subdues him. The police ask Mike to press assault charges so they can pressure Jimmy to testify against Nacho, which Mike initially agrees to do, but he later changes his mind. He suggests to Jimmy that his theory about the Kettlemans' disappearance is correct and recounts a similar case he investigated as a Philadelphia police officer. Based on that experience, Mike tells Jimmy the Kettlemans are probably hiding somewhere close to home. Jimmy explores the desert near the Kettleman house and finds their campsite. He confronts the Kettlemans and inadvertently discovers their stolen money.

== Production ==
The episode was written by co-executive producer Thomas Schnauz, who was also a writer and producer on Breaking Bad. It was directed by Terry McDonough, who directed episodes for Breaking Bad, including the episode that introduced Saul Goodman.

== Reception ==
Upon airing, the episode received 3.23 million American viewers and an 18-49 rating of 1.6.

Erik Kain of Forbes said that "Overall, this was yet another strong entry in the show. Great shots of New Mexico, plenty of humor, and a little bit of mystery all kept this one humming from start to finish."

Michael Hogan of The Telegraph gave the episode 4 out of 5 stars, concluding:

Better Call Saul has hit the ground running and already become one of the best shows on TV – even if it’s not on TV in the traditional sense. A worthy prequel to Breaking Bad. Perhaps lightning can strike twice in the same place after all.

Roth Cornet of IGN gave the episode 8.5 out of 10, saying, "Better Call Saul continues to settle into itself, as Jimmy McGill's will to do the right thing is tested." Richard Vine of The Guardian also gave a positive review, and was pleased that the episode began to examine Jimmy's relationships with Chuck and Kim, saying of Kim, "You really get the sense that she's fond of him, against her better judgement".

The episode earned a 100% "fresh" rating on Rotten Tomatoes out of 20 reviews.
