= Alpine Shepherd Boy =

- Better Call Saul episode
- Episode no.: Season 1 Episode 5
- Directed by: Nicole Kassell
- Written by: Bradley Paul
- Editing by: Skip Macdonald
- Original air date: March 2, 2015
- Running time: 44 minutes

Guest appearances
- Clea DuVall as Dr. Lara Cruz; Kerry Condon as Stacey Ehrmantraut; Tim Baltz as Roland Jaycox; Carol Herman as Geraldine Strauss; Barry Shabaka Henley as Detective Greg Sanders; Omid Abtahi as Detective Abbasi

Episode chronology
← Previous "Hero"	Next → "Five-O"
- Better Call Saul season 1

"Alpine Shepherd Boy" is the fifth episode of the first season of the AMC television series Better Call Saul, a spin-off series of Breaking Bad. The episode aired on March 2, 2015, on AMC in the United States. Outside of the United States, the episode premiered on the streaming service Netflix in several countries.

In the episode, Chuck McGill (Michael McKean) is arrested and hospitalized after stealing his neighbor's newspaper. In the hospital, he is interviewed regarding his alleged condition of electromagnetic hypersensitivity. Meanwhile, Chuck's brother, Jimmy (Bob Odenkirk), meets potential legal clients and eventually finds business soliciting from an assisted living facility.

== Plot ==
Police arrive at Chuck McGill's house after his neighbor reports the stolen newspaper. (Note: As seen in "Hero".) Chuck's living conditions cause the officers to believe he is producing methamphetamine, so they kick in his door and tase him.

The publicity from Jimmy McGill's billboard rescue results in several new prospective clients, most of whom are not viable because of their eccentricities. After a fruitless day, Jimmy visits Mrs. Strauss, an elderly woman who collects Hummel figurines, one of which is a rare and valuable Alpine Shepherd Boy. He assists her with estate planning, which consists mostly of allocating her Hummels to friends and relatives. Mrs. Strauss finds Jimmy's personality charming. He offers to take half his fee in advance and half after her will is completed, but she pays the full amount up front in cash.

That evening, Kim Wexler suggests Jimmy's success with his older clients might lend itself to a career in elder law. Jimmy considers it, but is interrupted when Kim takes a call from Howard Hamlin, revealing that Chuck has been hospitalized.

A doctor proves Chuck's electromagnetic hypersensitivity is psychosomatic by turning on his hospital bed's control panel without him noticing. She recommends Chuck be committed to a mental institution, but Chuck wants to go home and Jimmy supports his decision. When Howard arrives, Jimmy seemingly decides to have Chuck committed as a way to force a buyout, but tells Kim he only said it to scare Howard. Jimmy brings Chuck home and discovers Chuck has learned of his billboard rescue. Jimmy promises a skeptical Chuck he will follow the rules in the future.

After mimicking Andy Griffith's clothing and mannerisms from the TV series Matlock, Jimmy promotes his new elder law specialty at an assisted living facility. Exiting the courthouse parking lot, Jimmy gives Mike Ehrmantraut a business card with his new "Need a Will? Call McGill!" slogan printed on it.

Later, Mike is seen parked outside a woman's house. She comes out, gets in her car, and stares at Mike uncomfortably for several moments before they drive away in opposite directions. Mike is then visited at home by several police officers, one of whom he recognizes from his own tenure as an officer in Philadelphia.

== Production ==
"Alpine Shepherd Boy" is the first Better Call Saul episode not to be written or directed by someone who wrote or directed for Breaking Bad. It was directed by Nicole Kassell and written by Bradley Paul. The episode was originally titled "Jello", referring to the advertisements Jimmy had for his law practice on the bottom of the Jello lids that were given to the elderly. The showrunners intended each season one episode title to end in the letter "o" but were unable to obtain permission to use the trademarked gelatin brand name "Jell-O". As such, "Alpine Shepherd Boy" was the only season one episode to fail to end in the letter, and the only episode with a title longer than one word.

== Reception ==
Upon airing, the episode received 2.71 million American viewers, and an 18-49 rating of 1.2.

The episode received critical acclaim. On Rotten Tomatoes, based on 20 reviews, it received a 95% approval rating with an average score of 6.80 out of 10. The site's consensus reads, "With 'Alpine Shepherd Boy', Better Call Saul continues to forge its own identity while establishing its characters and their journeys in surprising ways." IGN gave the episode a 9.0 rating. The Telegraph rated the episode 4 out of 5 stars.
