= Gennifer Hutchison =

American screenwriter

- Born: 1976 or 1977 (age 49–50); Concord, Massachusetts, U.S.
- Occupations: Screenwriter, producer
- Years active: 1993–present
- Television: Better Call Saul, Breaking Bad, The X-Files, Star Trek: Enterprise, The Strain
- Spouse: Andrew Ortner (m. 2013)

Gennifer Hutchison (born 1976 or 1977) is an American television and film writer. She is best known for her work on the television series Breaking Bad. She won two Writers Guild of America Awards for her work on the series as a part of the writing team in 2012 and 2013. She was also a writer and executive producer on Better Call Saul.

Prior to Breaking Bad, she worked in the production staff for the television series The Lone Gunmen, The X-Files, Star Trek: Enterprise, Grey's Anatomy and Mad Men. She also worked on The Strain as a writer and producer during its first season.

== Career ==
Hutchison got her start in the entertainment industry as a PA in the writers' office at The X-Files. She went on to become writer/producer Vince Gilligan's assistant during the show's final seasons. After the show ended, she worked on a number of pilots and short-lived shows as a writers' assistant and producers' assistant, ending up as showrunner Matthew Weiner's assistant on Mad Men during its first season.

After finding out about former boss Gilligan's new pilot Breaking Bad – also on AMC – she reached out and was offered a job as Gilligan's assistant. When Hutchison and the show returned for its second season, she spoke to Gilligan about her ambition to write for the show. She was tasked with writing the show's additional content, such as webisodes and blogs, as an audition. Her work impressed Gilligan, and she was offered a freelance script in season three, and subsequently brought on board as a writer. She remained on the show for the remainder of its run, rising to the position of executive story editor in the show's fifth and final season.

After Breaking Bad ended, she spent a season as a producer on FX's horror-drama The Strain, writing two of the show's first-season episodes.

She rejoined Gilligan and his co-creator Peter Gould on Breaking Bad prequel Better Call Saul as a supervising producer. Hutchison has, to date, written two episodes per season, rising to co-executive producer in season two, and executive producer in season three. She has received an Emmy nomination in the Outstanding Drama Series category for each season of the show.

In film, Hutchison adapted Victoria Aveyard's novel Red Queen for Universal in 2015. In June 2016, she signed an overall deal with Sony Pictures TV, the studio behind both Breaking Bad and Better Call Saul.

In December 2017, it was announced that Hutchison is adapting the Welcome to Night Vale podcast for television. The series is being developed at FX, under her overall deal with Sony Pictures TV.

== Personal life ==
Hutchison was born in Concord, Massachusetts, and grew up in a military family that moved frequently. She graduated from the University of San Francisco in 1998. She is married to Breaking Bad associate producer/post-production supervisor Andrew Ortner.

== Awards ==
Year	Award	Category	Show	Result
2010	Writers Guild of America Award	Best Episodic Drama	Breaking Bad	Nominated
2012	Writers Guild of America Award	Best Episodic Drama	Breaking Bad	Nominated
2013	Writers Guild of America Award	Best Episodic Drama	Breaking Bad	Won
2015	Primetime Emmy Award	Outstanding Drama Series	Better Call Saul	Nominated
2015	Writers Guild of America Award	Best Dramatic Series	Better Call Saul	Nominated
2015	Producers Guild of America Award	Best Episodic Drama	Better Call Saul	Nominated
2016	Primetime Emmy Award	Outstanding Drama Series	Better Call Saul	Nominated
2016	Writers Guild of America Award	Best Dramatic Series	Better Call Saul	Nominated
2016	Producers Guild of America Award	Best Episodic Drama	Better Call Saul	Nominated
2017	Primetime Emmy Award	Outstanding Drama Series	Better Call Saul	Nominated
2018	Writers Guild of America Award	Best Dramatic Series	Better Call Saul	Pending

== Filmography ==
Writer

Year	Show	Season	Episode title	Episode	Notes
2024	The Lord of the Rings: The Rings of Power	2	"Elven Kings Under the Sky"	1	
2022	The Lord of the Rings: The Rings of Power	1	"Alloyed"	8	Co-written with J. D. Payne & Patrick McKay
2022	The Lord of the Rings: The Rings of Power	1	"Adrift"	2	
2018	Better Call Saul	4	"Wiedersehen"	9	
2018	Better Call Saul	4	"Piñata"	6	
2017	Better Call Saul	3	"Lantern"	10	
2017	Better Call Saul	3	"Sunk Costs"	3	
2016	Better Call Saul	2	"Bali Ha'i"	6	
2016	Better Call Saul	2	"Cobbler"	2	
2015	Better Call Saul	1	"Bingo"	7	
2015	Better Call Saul	1	"Hero"	4	
2014	The Strain	1	"Loved Ones"	10	
2014	The Strain	1	"Runaways"	5	
2013	Breaking Bad	5	"Confessions"	11	
2012	Breaking Bad	5	"Buyout"	6	
2011	Breaking Bad	4	"Salud"	10	Co-written with Peter Gould
2011	Breaking Bad	4	"Cornered"	6	
2010	Breaking Bad	3	"I See You"	8	

Production staff

Year	Show	Role	Notes
2022	The Lord of the Rings: The Rings of Power	Executive producer	Season 1
2018	Better Call Saul	Executive producer	Season 4
2017	Better Call Saul	Executive producer	Season 3
2016	Better Call Saul	Co-executive producer	Season 2
2015	Better Call Saul	Supervising producer	Season 1
2014	The Strain	Producer	Season 1
2013	Breaking Bad	Executive story editor	Season 5
2012	Breaking Bad	Story editor	Season 5
2009	Breaking Bad	Script coordinator	Season 2–3
