= Five-O (Better Call Saul) =

- Better Call Saul episode
- Episode no.: Season 1 Episode 6
- Directed by: Adam Bernstein
- Written by: Gordon Smith
- Original air date: March 9, 2015
- Running time: 42 minutes

Guest appearances
- Kerry Condon as Stacey Ehrmantraut; Barry Shabaka Henley as Detective Greg Sanders; Omid Abtahi as Detective Abbasi; Joe DeRosa as Dr. Caldera; Billy Malone as Sergeant Jack Fensky; Lane Garrison as Officer Troy Hoffman; Faith Healey as Kaylee Ehrmantraut

Episode chronology
| ← Previous "Alpine Shepherd Boy" | Next → "Bingo" |
- Better Call Saul season 1

"Five-O" is the sixth episode of the first season of the AMC television series Better Call Saul, a spin-off series of Breaking Bad. The episode aired on March 9, 2015, on AMC in the United States. Outside of the United States, the episode premiered on the streaming service Netflix in several countries.

The episode shows three moments in the life of former Philadelphia police officer Mike Ehrmantraut (Jonathan Banks), who moved to Albuquerque to become a ticket clerk. In the cold open, Mike is shown at a train station in Albuquerque, where he meets his daughter-in-law Stacey (Kerry Condon). In the present, set in 2002, Philadelphia police have come to Albuquerque to interview Mike regarding the murders of police officers Jack Fensky and Troy Hoffman in 2001. Later, Mike tells Stacey what happened to the officers and her husband, Matt, which is shown as a flashback to 2001.

The episode received acclaim from critics, with Banks' performance being singled out for praise.

== Plot ==
=== Opening ===
In a flashback, Mike Ehrmantraut leaves a train in Albuquerque and re-bandages his wounded left shoulder, then meets his daughter-in-law Stacey (Note: The woman Mike sees leave her house in "Alpine Shepherd Boy".) and granddaughter Kaylee. Stacey and Mike briefly discuss the death of Matt, Mike's son and Stacey's husband. Afterward, Mike's wounded shoulder is treated by Dr. Caldera, an Albuquerque veterinarian, with ties to the local criminal underworld.

=== Main story ===
Philadelphia detectives Sanders and Abbasi (Note: Who met Mike at his house at the end of "Alpine Shepherd Boy".) attempt to question Mike, who requests that Jimmy McGill represent him. The detectives are investigating the death of Mike's son Matt, a police officer killed in a 2001 ambush. Matt's partner Troy Hoffman and Sergeant Jack Fensky were killed in a similar ambush six months later and the detectives suspect Mike. Jimmy intentionally spills his coffee on Abbasi so Mike can steal his notebook while pretending to help him clean his jacket.

Mike learns from Abbasi's notes that Stacey contacted Philadelphia police after she discovered money Matt previously hid in the lining of a suitcase, hoping that investigating the source of the cash would help identify Matt's killer.

In a flashback to Philadelphia, Mike breaks into a police car outside a bar. He then enters the bar and drunkenly tells Fensky and Hoffman he knows what they did. At closing time, Mike announces his planned move to Albuquerque. As he staggers home, Fensky and Hoffman offer him a ride and help him into the back seat, where he tells them he knows they killed Matt. Fensky and Hoffman drive to an empty garage, where they make plans to kill him. Mike reveals he was feigning his drunkenness, holding the officers at gunpoint with a revolver he had hidden in the back seat when he broke into the car earlier. In the ensuing shootout, Mike kills both officers and leaves Philadelphia for Albuquerque.

In Albuquerque, Mike admits to Stacey that corruption was rampant in Matt's precinct and included Mike. When Hoffman offered to include Matt, Matt asked for Mike's advice. Mike suggested not taking the bribes would mark him as a whistleblower, so he should accept, which he reluctantly did, only for Hoffman and Fensky to murder him anyway because Matt's hesitation made them fear he would turn them in. Stacey then asks who killed Hoffman and Fensky; Mike tells her she now knows what happened and asks if she can live with it.

== Production ==
The script was the first-ever television script written by Gordon Smith, who was previously a writer's assistant on Breaking Bad. It was directed by Adam Bernstein, who directed several episodes of Breaking Bad.

== Reception ==
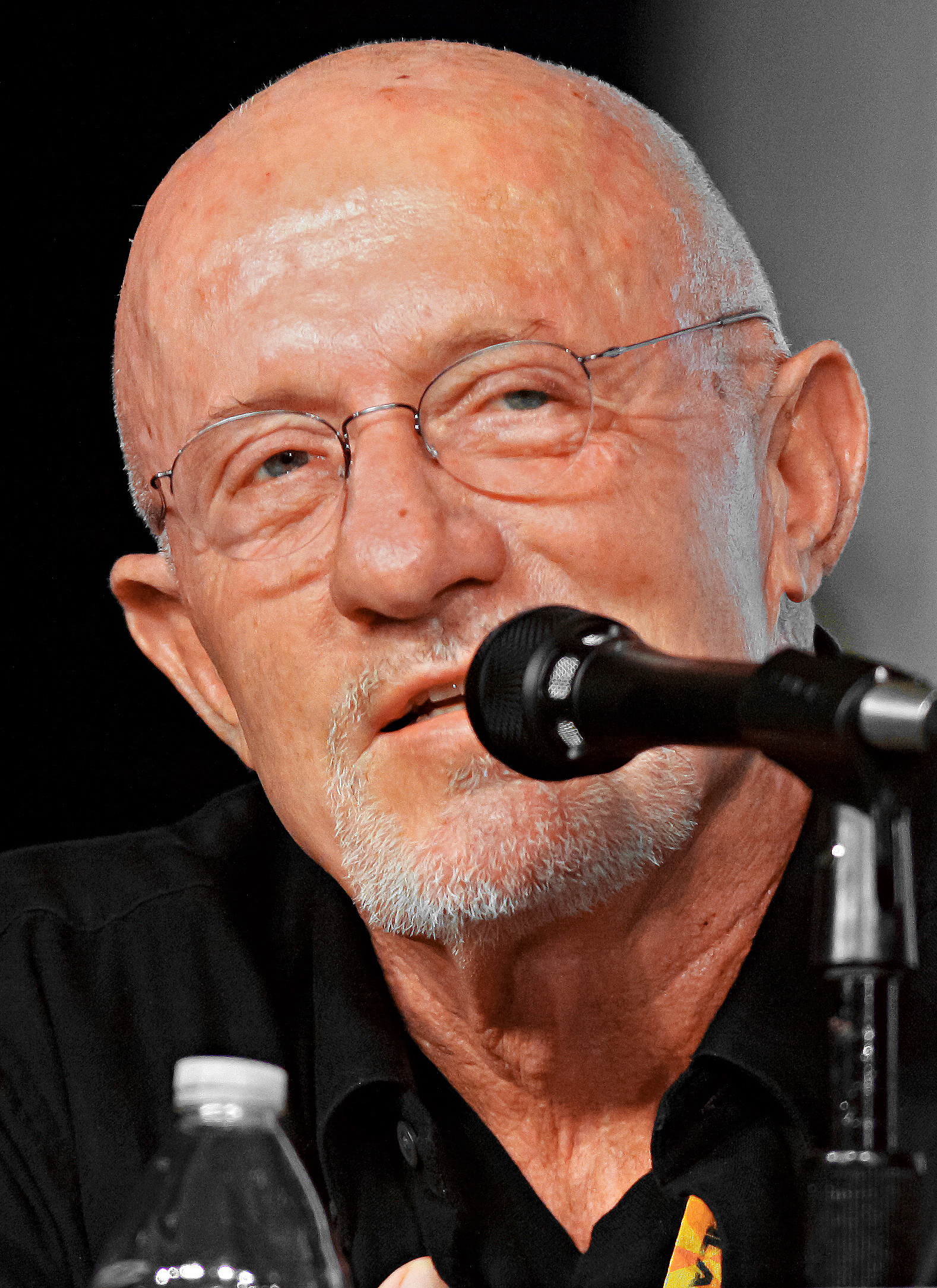
Jonathan Banks received critical acclaim for his performance in the episode, which earned him a Primetime Emmy Award nomination.

Upon airing, the episode received 2.57 million American viewers, and an 18–49 rating of 1.3.

The episode received near universal acclaim, with unanimous praise for Jonathan Banks's performance, which some critics considered award-worthy. On Rotten Tomatoes, based on 25 reviews, it received a 100% approval rating with an average score of 8.80 out of 10. The site's consensus reads, "In a departure from the existing Better Call Saul narrative, 'Five-O' provides essential backstory for Mike's character, delivered in a gripping, award-worthy performance by Jonathan Banks."

Roth Cornet of IGN gave it a score of 9.7 out of 10, praising the performance of Jonathan Banks, the episode's pacing and interwoven storylines, as well as the final scene of the episode. She concluded, "Better Call Saul continues to deliver some of the best of what television has to offer as both those familiar with Breaking Bad and new viewers alike were given a shattering look at Mike's tragic past." Tim Surette of TV.com also highly praised the performance of Banks, and wrote it is worthy of an Emmy, calling it "one of the best episodes to date of 2015's best new show to date".

"Five-O" received three Primetime Emmy Award nominations. Jonathan Banks was nominated for Outstanding Supporting Actor in a Drama Series, Gordon Smith was nominated for Outstanding Writing for a Drama Series, and Kelley Dixon was nominated for Outstanding Single-Camera Picture Editing for a Drama Series. When Peter Dinklage won for Outstanding Supporting Actor, he praised the other nominees, and singled out Banks by name.
