= Bradley Paul =

American poet and screenwriter (born 1972)

Bradley Ormond Paul (born 1972, in Baltimore, Maryland) is an American poet and screenwriter.

He graduated from the University of Tennessee at Chattanooga, and the University of Iowa Writers' Workshop. His work has appeared in American Poetry Review, Boston Review, Smartish Pace, Fence, Pleiades, Iowa Review, and many other journals. He has written for AMC's Lodge 49, TNT's Animal Kingdom, AMC's Better Call Saul and CBS's Hawaii Five-0.

He lives in Los Angeles with his wife, the artist and writer Karri Paul.

== Awards ==
- 2009 AWP Donald Hall Prize

== Works ==
- "My Quietness Has A Man In It"; "Two Front Teeth"; "On The Sleeve"; "It's Weird That So Many Animals Including Us Have Lungs"; "A Monkey Could Write This Poem"; "Immediately Upon Pruning a Favorite Tree", Action, Yes, Summer 2010.
- "Seventh of Twelve"; "Homage to Edvard Kocbek"; "Why I Left Nepal"; "Noah Remembers the Coast of Senegal"; "Description of the Salt Cellar", Boston Review, Summer 2000
- "Anybody Can Write a Poem", poets.org
- The Obvious New Issues/Western Michigan University, 2004, ISBN 978-1-930974-47-0
- The Animals All Are Gathering University of Pittsburgh Press, October 28, 2010, ISBN 978-0-8229-6121-5

== Filmography ==
Year	Title	Notes
2004	The Apothecary	Director and writer
2006	Two Front Teeth	Line producer
2008	The Animals All Are Gathering	Director
2009	Donkeyface	Director and writer
2013	Hawaii Five-0	Writer, episode "Ua Nalohia"
2015	Better Call Saul	Writer, episode "Alpine Shepherd Boy"
2018–2019	Lodge 49	Writer, 2 episodes Co-executive producer, 10 episodes Co-producer, 10 episodes
2018–2022	Animal Kingdom	Writer, 9 episodes Executive producer, 13 episodes Co-executive producer, 26 episodes Supervising producer, 13 episodes
2021	Heels	Writer, 1 episode Producer, 8 episodes
