= Hero (Better Call Saul) =

- Better Call Saul episode
- Episode no.: Season 1 Episode 4
- Directed by: Colin Bucksey
- Written by: Gennifer Hutchison
- Original air date: February 23, 2015
- Running time: 47 minutes

Guest appearances
- Julie Ann Emery as Betsy Kettleman; Jeremy Shamos as Craig Kettleman; Mel Rodriguez as Marco Pasternak; Eileen Fogarty as Mrs. Nguyen; Kevin Weisman as Stevie; Dawnn Lewis as The Judge; Josh Fadem as Joey Dixon; Dorian Missick as Detective Dunst; Julian Bonfiglio as The Sound Guy

Episode chronology
← Previous "Nacho"	Next → "Alpine Shepherd Boy"
- Better Call Saul season 1

"Hero" is the fourth episode of the first season of the AMC television series Better Call Saul, a spin-off series of Breaking Bad. The episode aired on February 23, 2015, on AMC in the United States. Outside the United States the episode premiered on the streaming service Netflix in several countries.

In the episode's cold open, Jimmy McGill (Bob Odenkirk) is shown in his hometown of Cicero, Illinois, in 1992, scamming an unsuspecting bar patron with his friend Marco Pasternark (Mel Rodriguez). In the main story, Jimmy McGill finds the missing Kettleman family, who were camping in the woods outside their home to avoid Nacho Varga (Michael Mando) stealing the money they embezzled from the Bernalillo County treasury. Betsy Kettleman (Julie Ann Emery) bribes Jimmy not to reveal the money to authorities. Meanwhile, Jimmy impersonates the likeness of his former boss, Howard Hamlin (Patrick Fabian) in a billboard ad, and stages a scenario in which he saves a man from falling from the billboard.

== Plot ==
=== Opening ===
In a flashback to 1992, Jimmy McGill and a man named Stevie leave a bar and Jimmy jokes that his name is Saul Goodman. (Note: A play on the phrase "it's all good, man") In an alley, they discover a barely conscious drunk man next to a wallet full of cash. Stevie takes the cash and Jimmy takes the man's Rolex watch. Jimmy estimates the Rolex to be worth more than the wallet, leading Stevie to trade the found money plus additional cash of his own for the watch. After Stevie runs away with the watch, a cheap counterfeit, Jimmy and the "unconscious" man, his partner Marco Pasternak, return to Jimmy's residence to split the proceeds of their scam.

=== Main story ===
In the present, Jimmy gives the Kettlemans the option of hiring him. Instead, they offer a bribe if he does not reveal they are in possession of the stolen $1.6 million, (Note: As seen in "Nacho") which he reluctantly accepts after they refer to him as "the kind of lawyer that guilty people hire". Nacho Varga is released from custody and accuses Jimmy of warning the Kettlemans. Jimmy denies this but claims that whoever did so did it for the sake of their children, and that Nacho should be grateful the warning prevented him from committing kidnapping or murder, especially as he was already noticed.

Jimmy enters the money from the Kettlemans in his accounts as a retainer so it appears to be a legitimate payment. He spends the money on a personal makeover that imitates Howard Hamlin’s appearance and a billboard advertisement that shares obvious similarities with Hamlin, Hamlin & McGill. Kim Wexler confronts Jimmy, and Howard sues him for trademark infringement. The court rules for HHM and Jimmy is ordered to remove the billboard.

After failing to persuade news outlets to cover his predicament as a human-interest story, Jimmy hires a freelance college media team to record his video plea for sympathy. During filming, the worker removing the billboard falls and is held up only by his safety harness. Jimmy climbs up and pulls the worker to safety while passersby watch and record, as does his media team. Howard and Kim suspect Jimmy staged the rescue for publicity; Kim smiles at the news broadcast praising Jimmy.

The next day, Jimmy brings Chuck McGill's daily newspapers, but hides the local one that includes a report on the rescue. Chuck becomes suspicious when he notices the missing paper, so he braves exposure to electricity to run to his neighbor's driveway and takes theirs, leaving a $5 bill as payment.

== Production ==
The episode was written by supervising producer Gennifer Hutchison, who was also a writer and producer on Breaking Bad. It was directed by Colin Bucksey, who directed four episodes of Breaking Bad. This is the first episode chronologically in which the name Saul Goodman is used.

== Reception ==
Upon airing, the episode received 2.87 million American viewers, and an 18–49 rating of 1.4.

The episode received a positive reception from critics. On Rotten Tomatoes, based on 22 reviews, it received a 95% approval rating with an average score of 8.19 out of 10. The site's consensus reads, "'Hero' marks the essential early evolution of Saul's conning skills, beginning his amusing transformation into the well-known Breaking Bad personality."
