= Mike Ehrmantraut =

Fictional character from Breaking Bad and Better Call Saul

- Breaking Bad / Better Call Saul character
- Jonathan Banks as Mike Ehrmantraut in a promotional poster for Better Call Saul's third season
- First appearance: "ABQ"; Breaking Bad; May 31, 2009
- Last appearance: "Saul Gone"; Better Call Saul; August 15, 2022
- Created by: Vince Gilligan
- Portrayed by: Jonathan Banks

In-universe information
- Full name: Michael Ehrmantraut
- Alias: Dave Clark
- Occupation: Marine Corps Scout Sniper; Philadelphia Police Department Police Officer; Cleaner; Head of Los Pollos Corporate Security; Hitman; Private investigator; Parking attendant with SMQ Parking at Albuquerque courthouse; Security consultant for Madrigal Electromotive
- Children: Matt Ehrmantraut (son, deceased)
- Relatives: Stacey Ehrmantraut (daughter-in-law); Kaylee Ehrmantraut (granddaughter)
- Home: Albuquerque, New Mexico, United States
- Nationality: American
- Ethnicity: German American
- Date of birth: Early 1940s
- Place of birth: Philadelphia, Pennsylvania, United States
- Date of death: October 2, 2009

Michael "Mike" Ehrmantraut (/ˈɜːrməntraʊt/ UR-mən-trowt) is a fictional character portrayed by Jonathan Banks in the television series Breaking Bad and its spinoff prequel Better Call Saul. Mike is a private investigator, head of security, fixer, and hitman who works for Gus Fring—and, on occasion, Saul Goodman. While a police officer in Philadelphia, he engaged in corrupt activities that indirectly led to the death of his son Matt, leading Mike to move to Albuquerque to watch over and financially support his daughter-in-law Stacey and granddaughter Kaylee through jobs in the criminal underworld.

Introduced in Breaking Bad's season 2 finale "ABQ", he serves as a major character from season 3 to season 5. Mike appears as one of the main protagonists and is further explored in Better Call Saul, showcasing how he met Saul and Gus, as well as his family relations and gradual moral decline. The character has been praised by critics and Banks' performance has received several acting awards and nominations.

== Creation ==
The writers of Breaking Bad created the character of Mike Ehrmantraut as a substitute for Saul Goodman, when actor Bob Odenkirk was unavailable for the second-season finale "ABQ" because of a commitment to appear in How I Met Your Mother. They cast Jonathan Banks because they admired his work in the 1980s police drama Wiseguy. Banks himself thought he would come on and do the role for "ABQ", but was impressed by working alongside Aaron Paul in that scene, and with the overall direction that Vince Gilligan had provided for the episode. Banks considered his character close to that of Max von Sydow's Joubert from Three Days of the Condor, an assassin that painted figurines on the side. Following Mike's death in the fifth season episode "Say My Name", Banks said this did not surprise him because he always believed the character would die at some point.

Mike continued to appear in Better Call Saul and appears during a flashback scene in El Camino: A Breaking Bad Movie (2019). He is one of only five characters to appear in Breaking Bad, Better Call Saul, and El Camino, the other four being Walter White, Jesse Pinkman, Ed Galbraith and Austin Ramey.

== Character biography ==
=== Background ===
According to Banks, Mike is a Marine Corps veteran who served in the Vietnam War. Mike's military service is implied in the Better Call Saul second-season episode "Gloves Off" when he mentions his familiarity with a black market sniper rifle he intends to buy. He subsequently became a beat officer in the Philadelphia Police Department.

Mike responded to domestic abuse cases and frequently dealt with a particular man named Gordie, an alcoholic who regularly beat his wife. Every weekend, Mike and his partner would be called to their house, place the woman in the care of EMTs, take her husband to the drunk tank for the night, and send him back home in the morning when he sobered up, since his wife was too afraid to press charges. Eventually, one night, Mike became so furious over the abuse that he put his revolver in Gordie's mouth and was about to kill him, but relented when he begged for his life, and gave him a warning instead. Mike came to regret his decision, however, when Gordie murdered his wife two weeks later. From that point on, Mike resolved to never take half measures. He recounts the incident to Walt in the Breaking Bad episode "Half Measures", in an attempt to teach him the lesson.

Mike was married for 22 years, as he mentions in season 4 of Better Call Saul. His former wife's name and fate are never revealed. Mike had one son, Matt, who also became a police officer. Matt married Stacey and they had a daughter, Kaylee.

In an extended flashback in the Better Call Saul episode "Five-O", Mike is revealed to have been a corrupt police officer who took bribes; his first he took in 1984. Matt was approached by other corrupt officers and asked Mike for advice; Mike advised Matt that not taking the money would label him a whistleblower, and endanger his life and family, so Matt very reluctantly took it. However, Matt's partner and another officer, Jack Fensky and Troy Hoffman, killed Matt anyway because his hesitation caused them to think he might turn them in.

Stacey and Kaylee left Philadelphia for Albuquerque after Matt's funeral, while Mike retired from the police department. Mike identified Hoffman and Fensky as Matt's killers, and arranged an ambush to both confirm and kill them. After this, he left for Albuquerque, allowing him to watch over Stacey and Kaylee. Upon first arriving he makes contact with Dr. Caldera, a veterinarian with ties to the local criminal underworld.

=== Better Call Saul ===
==== Season 1 ====
Mike works as a parking lot attendant at the courthouse. He has frequent encounters with Jimmy McGill, dealing with him when leaving the parking lot, consistently irritated with Mike's demands for payment or the right number of validation stickers. In the aftermath of a physical conflict between the two, Mike decides not to press charges when he learns that Jimmy believes that his clients, Betsy and Craig Kettleman, staged their own disappearance, which no one else believes. Mike then aids Jimmy by providing advice which allows him to prove this to be true.

Philadelphia officers involved in the investigation of Hoffman and Fensky's murders interrogate Mike, who hires Jimmy to represent him. Mike has Jimmy create a diversion, enabling Mike to steal one detective's notepad to learn what they know. He finds that Stacey contacted them after finding money hidden in the lining of one of her suitcases. Mike admits to her that he was involved in corruption in Philadelphia, and confesses that he "broke" Matt by persuading him to go along. He reveals how Hoffman and Fensky killed him for fear he would report them, and that he retaliated by killing the two of them, and then moved to Albuquerque to be near Stacey and Kaylee. Stacey accepts Mike's explanation and consoles him. The detectives leave for Philadelphia, and one privately assures Mike that he has little to fear. Mike later pays Jimmy back for representing him by helping him recover and return the money the Kettlemans embezzled.

Wanting more money to help support Stacey and Kaylee, Mike contacts Dr. Caldera to hook him up with security and "muscle" jobs. One of these jobs is protecting Daniel Wormald ("Pryce") during a drug deal with Nacho Varga. Mike does not bring a weapon, but remains calm and controlled. When the payment is $20 short, Mike insists that Nacho pay in full. After the deal is complete, Mike explains that he investigated Nacho beforehand and determined he was operating without the knowledge of his bosses in the Salamanca drug cartel, giving him an incentive to ensure that the transaction went smoothly.

==== Season 2 ====
Daniel buys a flashy Hummer with his drug money, so Mike refuses to go to the deal in such a conspicuous car, leading Daniel to go alone. Taking advantage of Mike's absence, Nacho finds Daniel's address and later breaks into his house, stealing his money and collection of baseball cards. Daniel reports the theft to the police, forcing Mike to intervene by convincing Nacho to return the cards and $10,000 to Daniel in exchange for the Hummer. To prevent Daniel from possibly implicating him, Mike has Jimmy represent him during his meeting with the police.

Impressed by Mike's work for Daniel, Nacho approaches him with a request to kill his boss Tuco Salamanca. Nacho fears Tuco may learn about his outside drug deals and the potential consequences of his erratic behavior. Rather than kill Tuco, Mike engineers a public altercation so that Tuco is sentenced to prison for assault. Tuco's uncle Hector wants to reduce Tuco's prison sentence by having Mike tell the police that the gun Tuco was carrying was his. After Mike refuses, Hector eventually threatens Stacey and Kaylee so he will comply. Mike agrees to take responsibility for the gun in exchange for a $50,000 payment.

Upset at Hector's threats, Mike attempts to disrupt Hector's drug trade by hijacking a Salamanca truck and stealing the $250,000 it carries, but leaving the driver, Ximenez Lecerda, tied up at the side of the road. He intended for the police to find the scene and therefore bring pressure down on the Salamanca operation; however, Nacho tells him that someone stopped to help, Ximenez called Hector, and Hector's crew killed the "good samaritan" and cleaned up the scene.

Mike decides to kill Hector and procures a black market sniper rifle. As he prepares to fire, he is suddenly interrupted by the horn of his own car. Mike finds a branch wedged against the horn and a note on the windshield with a single word: "DON'T".

==== Season 3 ====
Mike realizes that he is being tracked by a third party, and hastily uncovers trackers in his cars' gas caps. He thoroughly reverse engineers them in order to uncover the culprit, eventually bringing him to the restaurant Los Pollos Hermanos. He hires Jimmy to investigate inside, but results come up empty. Eventually Mike finds himself face-to-face with the one responsible, Gus Fring, the owner of the Los Pollos Hermanos restaurant chain, which is part of the cartel's drug trafficking operation. Gus explains to Mike that he does not want Hector dead until he decides the time is right. However, he encourages Mike to continue to disrupt Hector's drug trafficking, and provides him resources which he uses to cause the Salamancas' legitimate ice cream shop used as a front to be raided by the DEA.

Gus attempts to pay him for the job, but Mike does not accept the money, impressing Gus even more. Later, Mike asks for help to launder the $250,000 he stole, and Gus obliges by arranging for Madrigal Electromotive, the parent company of Los Pollos and a participant in its drug activities, to hire Mike as a contracted security expert and pay him monthly consulting fees.

Meanwhile, Mike also participates in other ventures and activities. He poses as a repairman and fixes the door of Jimmy's brother Chuck's house, while clandestinely taking pictures of his home environment and copying information from his address book for Jimmy. Mike joins Stacey at group therapy sessions to help her overcome Matt's death and befriends a woman named Anita from her support group. Later, he acts as Daniel's bodyguard once more for another deal with Nacho, who buys empty capsules from Daniel and plans to replace Hector's heart medication with fake pills, which Mike knows is part of a plot to kill Hector. Mike advises Nacho to switch the pills back if he is successful, so that Hector's death cannot be traced back to him.

==== Season 4 ====
Mike quits working at the courthouse parking lot and decides to conduct actual surprise security consulting at Madrigal. Lydia Rodarte-Quayle informs him the consulting contract was supposed to be a paper transaction, but Mike argues that his inspections provide plausible cover if anyone questions the payments. When Lydia complains to Gus, he tacitly approves of Mike's actions. At the group therapy sessions, Mike's conflicted feeling over his still unresolved trauma regarding Matt's death bubbles up to the point he confronts another attendee over his lies, which causes a temporary rift between Stacey and Mike.

Tension between the Salamancas and Gus' organization leads to Hector suffering a stroke. Gus discreetly pays for his recovery to the point where he recovers his mental faculties and can move his right index finger. Gus confronts Mike, aware that he knew about Nacho's plan to kill Hector but didn't inform him. In reality, Gus intends to hire Mike to help with his secret project: the construction of a meth lab under an industrial laundry as part of a plan to end his reliance on cartel cocaine smuggled from Mexico. Mike is put in charge and arranges for structural engineers to visit and assess the site while Gus silently observes. Gus selects German engineer Werner Ziegler to oversee construction of the lab and has Mike arrange the accommodations and security for Werner and his men during the months-long project.

Over the subsequent months, Mike befriends Werner and even covers for him to Gus when Werner inadvertently reveals some details of the lab's construction to patrons at a local bar. When construction falls behind schedule, a homesick Werner escapes, intending to meet his wife at a nearby spa. Mike catches up to Werner, but realizes that he has inadvertently revealed the existence of a construction project to Hector's nephew Lalo Salamanca, who has arrived to take over the Salamanca drug business. Gus realizes Werner will have to be killed to protect the secret of the meth lab. He offers to send men to do it, but Mike accepts responsibility because Werner escaped on his watch, and says he will do it himself. He convinces Werner to tell his wife to return to Germany, then executes him in the desert.

==== Season 5 ====
Werner's death forces Gus to halt construction of the lab. Mike reacts with disgust at Gus' seeming lack of compassion for Werner and refuses Gus' offer to continue paying him during the delay. Mike continues to struggle with Werner's death and drinks to excess. He becomes alienated from his family when he loses his temper with Kaylee, which leads Stacey to ask Mike to keep his distance.

After a night of drinking, Mike is set upon by a street gang and breaks the leader's arm before walking away. Mike is later stabbed during a second altercation with the gang, which he sought out of guilt for Werner's death. He awakens at a ranch in Mexico that has ties to Gus, where his wounds have been treated by Dr. Barry Goodman. Gus meets with Mike and asks for his aid in his war against the Salamancas, revealing his true goal in working for the cartel is all for revenge, something he knows Mike understands. Mike agrees to join, and becomes Gus' second-hand man.

Mike learns that Gus has been using Nacho as a mole to uncover secrets about the Salamancas, and particularly Lalo, and has Nacho now report to Mike. Nacho informs Mike he wants out of the business and that Gus is threatening his father if he doesn't comply. To dispose of Lalo, Mike secretly points police to Lalo's car and its ties to the murder of Fred, a money wire clerk Lalo killed during the Werner incident, which causes his arrest.

When Lalo's arrest doesn't halt his troublemaking, Gus wants him released, so Mike gives Jimmy, who was hired as Lalo's lawyer, details about the work he did to investigate him. Jimmy uses the information to accuse police of witness tampering, enabling him to win Lalo's release on bail. At the same time, Mike spends time with Kaylee and tells Stacey he is over the recent events that angered him.

Lalo has Jimmy pick up the $7 million in bail money from a remote site in the desert. Several gunmen stop Jimmy, take the cash and prepare to kill him. Mike was tracking Jimmy for Gus and kills all but one of the attackers, who escapes. When Jimmy's car breaks down, Mike and Jimmy take the money and walk cross-country, camp overnight, and then resume their trek the next morning. When they see the surviving gunman is still searching, they work together to kill him. During a rest stop, an exhausted Jimmy asks Mike where he would go if he had a time machine, which he says would be 1984, the day he took his first bribe; he's slightly disappointed to learn Jimmy's answer is just to get more money.

Jimmy and Mike make their way to a truck stop, where Tyrus and Victor pick them up. Jimmy posts Lalo's bail and, following Mike's orders, says he was alone and his car broke down, so he walked in order to avoid risking the money. Mike updates Gus, who realizes Juan Bolsa hired the gunmen in the belief that he was protecting Gus' business by keeping Lalo in jail. Mike attempts to convince Gus to let Nacho go and stop targeting his father, but Gus refuses to let go of the useful asset.

Instead of going back to Mexico, Lalo returns to Albuquerque with Nacho and goes to Kim and Jimmy's apartment. Mike calls Jimmy to alert him to Lalo's imminent arrival and directs Jimmy to leave his phone on and hidden so Mike can listen in. As Mike trains a sniper rifle on Lalo from a nearby roof, Lalo reveals he found bullet holes in Jimmy's car, trying to force him to reveal the truth of what happened in the desert. Kim tells Lalo that passers-by probably shot at the car for fun and berates him for not trusting Jimmy. Lalo appears satisfied and departs.

Jimmy asks Mike why he is protecting him, but Mike hangs up. Mike informs Gus that Lalo is en route to his home in Chihuahua and Nacho is with him. Gus tells Mike he sent gunmen to kill Lalo and says Nacho might be able to help. Jimmy goes to Mike's house and demands to know why Mike has been aiding him. Mike simply tells Jimmy that Lalo will be killed that night. Unbeknownst to them, Lalo kills all but one of Gus' hitmen, forces the survivor to call his contact and report his death, then walks away from his home.

==== Season 6 ====
After Nacho escapes from assisting in Lalo's attempted murder, he is directed to hide in a motel by Tyrus. He then attempts to call Mike, who declines to answer. While Nacho remains hidden, Mike and Gus' men enter his home and pay his girlfriends to leave town. They break into Nacho's safe, from which Mike removes the cash and the fake Canadian IDs Nacho had made for himself and his father Manuel. Victor delivers a duplicate safe, into which Mike places the cash, Nacho's fake ID, and an envelope that contains details of an offshore bank account and the hotel where Nacho is staying; Nacho discovers he's been betrayed by Gus to the cartel and escapes. Mike engages in a standoff with Tyrus and Gus because he wants to lead a team to Mexico to find Nacho, but Gus wants to force Nacho to reveal himself by holding Manuel hostage.

Mike receives a call from Nacho, who asks to speak to Gus. Nacho offers to give himself up as long as Manuel is protected. Gus arranges to smuggle Nacho into the U.S. Afterwards, Mike and Nacho go over the plan for Nacho to absolve Gus of blame for Lalo's death by falsely blaming another drug family. After confessing, Nacho will attempt to flee so that Victor can kill him, guaranteeing his death will be swift and the Salamancas will not torture him. Mike administers a beating so it will appear Nacho was captured. While Mike watches and trains his rifle on the location, Gus, Tyrus, and Victor meet with Juan Bolsa, Hector, and the Cousins to hand Nacho over. Nacho claims he killed Lalo while working with a rival family, the Alvarezes. He further absolves Gus by admitting he tried to kill Hector, but that Gus saved him. Rather than attempt to flee, Nacho uses a piece of broken glass from Gus' trash to free himself from his restraints, seize Juan's gun, and kill himself. As Gus and his men depart, the Cousins assist Hector to fire bullets into Nacho's lifeless body. Mike places his rifle in its carrying case and walks back to the road so Gus, Tyrus, and Victor can pick him up.

Gus discovers that Lalo is still alive after an encounter with Hector, so has Mike and his team put on a massive surveillance system to keep track of where he may reappear. Mike has some of his men follow Kim and Jimmy, with the former noticing and confronting. Mike then meets with her personally and tells her the men work for him and that Lalo may still be alive. Kim realizes Mike is the man who helped Jimmy in the desert, and when she asks why he chose to tell her rather than Jimmy about Lalo, Mike tells her she is "made of sterner stuff". Kim then recognizes Mike as the former courthouse parking attendant, and she later chooses not to tell Jimmy that Lalo may still be alive. As Gus continues to worry over Lalo, he and Mike go to the site of the planned meth lab, where Gus hides a gun on an excavator.

Lalo then unexpectedly reveals himself at Kim's apartment, killing Howard Hamlin and forcing Kim to drive to Gus' house and shoot him. Mike intercepts Kim, then leads the majority of his men to her apartment to rescue Jimmy. Gus recognizes the shooting attempt as a diversion and drives to Lavandería Brillante, where he is ambushed by Lalo, who forces him to reveal the underground site where the meth lab is being constructed. Gus kills Lalo, but is wounded himself. Mike later supervises the cleanup of Howard's murder and the staging of his death as a suicide, as well as the burial of Howard and Lalo under the floor of the meth lab. He informs Jimmy and Kim to keep all the events a secret or else face consequences.

Sometime later, Mike informs Manuel of Nacho's death and promises revenge on the Salamancas. However, Manuel dismissively tells Mike he is no better than the criminals with whom he associates.

By 2008, Mike continues working full-time for Gus, while also occasionally serving as a private investigator for Jimmy, now fully going under the alias of Saul Goodman and working as a criminal lawyer. After Saul is kidnapped by Walter White and Jesse Pinkman during their effort to make Saul represent Brandon Mayhew ("Badger"), Mike does a background check on Walt. Mike's report to Saul includes the fact Walt has cancer. Mike describes Walt as an amateur and advises against working with him, but Saul is impressed by the quality of Walt's meth and decides to offer Walt his services.

=== Breaking Bad ===
==== Season 2 ====
After Walt allows Jane to die from a heroin overdose, Saul dispatches Mike to clean Jesse's apartment. Mike removes all traces of the drugs and provides Jesse advice that enables him to avoid incriminating himself when speaking to police after Mike leaves. When Jesse later goes missing, Mike tracks him down and drives Walt to the location.

==== Season 3 ====
With Walt and Skyler White in the middle of a divorce, Saul has Mike spy on Skyler. Mike sees Walt arrive home, followed soon after by Tuco's cousins, who intend to kill Walt in retaliation for Tuco's death. Mike has Gus call off the cousins, since Walt is central to Gus' meth making scheme, and Gus convinces them to instead target Hank Schrader, the DEA agent who killed Tuco. Gus' men then anonymously warns Hank, who is able to fight back. He survives the attack and kills one cousin, and Mike kills the other in the hospital via lethal injection.

The cartel disrupts Gus' meth distribution and he has Mike investigate. Mike kills the four cartel operatives sent to hold hostage Duane Chow, one of Gus' chemical suppliers. He later hides in one of the Los Pollos Hermanos trucks during a drug run so he can learn the cartel's tactics and implement countermeasures that protect future drug shipments.

While Walt and Jesse have been cooking meth in the underground superlab, Jesse has become more unstable. He learns that two of Gus' local drug dealers were responsible for the death of his friend Combo and have been employing a child Tomás, the younger brother of Jesse's girlfriend Andrea. Mike confronts Walter about dealing with Jesse as a loose end. Later, when the dealers kill Tomás, Walt saves Jesse's life by running them down with his car, and telling Jesse to flee. Gus keeps Walt on, but requires that he work with Gale Boetticher again. Walt correctly fears that once Gale knows enough to take over, Gus will have Walt and Jesse killed. Saul tricks Mike into looking for Jesse in the wrong place, giving Walt time to meet Jesse and tell him to find Gale's address. Mike later escorts Walt back to the lab on the pretense of responding to a chemical spill, but Walt knows Mike is intending to kill him. Walt begs Mike not to kill him, and offers to give up Jesse in exchange for his own life. Mike allows Walt to call Jesse and find out where he is hiding. Instead, Walt tells Jesse to kill Gale so that Gus will have to keep them alive to continue meth production.

==== Season 4 ====
Jesse kills Gale, and Victor arrives soon after and brings Jesse back to the lab. Mike and Victor keep watch over Jesse and Walt while waiting for Gus. Knowing he was recognized at Gale's house, and hoping to demonstrate that he can still be useful to Gus, Victor begins producing a batch of meth, revealing that he has learned the process by watching Walt and Jesse. Gus arrives and kills Victor in front of Mike, Walt, and Jesse, then tells them to get back to work. Mike increases security at the lab, including installing video cameras and personally standing watch over Walt and Jesse while they work.

Mike informs Gus they may be able to drive Walter and Jesse apart. Gus agrees, and Mike takes Jesse with him on dead-drop retrievals and other tasks. Jesse foils a prearranged attack on Mike, boosting his confidence and increasing his loyalty to Mike and Gus. After another Los Pollos Hermanos truck is robbed and the meth stolen, Jesse aids Mike in retrieving it. His competence convinces Mike and Gus to continue making use of Jesse, and he goes to Mexico with them for a meeting between Gus and the cartel leaders that is intended to end their dispute. Jesse produces a superior batch of meth on his own, and Gus offers to have him stay in Mexico to produce it for the cartel. Jesse is apprehensive, but the offer is a ruse. During a party at Don Eladio's house to celebrate the rapprochement, Gus uses a poisoned bottle of tequila to kill most of the cartel leaders, taking the first drink himself to alleviate suspicion. Mike is shot helping Gus escape, and Jesse helps both the ill Gus and injured Mike make their way to pre-planned medical treatment. For the doctor Gus has hired, Mike's wounds are secondary to Gus' illness. After Gus recovers, Mike remains in Mexico for several weeks while Gus and Jesse return to Albuquerque. While Mike is recovering, Walt engineers Gus' death, after which he and Jesse destroy the meth lab.

==== Season 5 ====
Mike learns of Gus' death and intends to kill Walt in retaliation. As Mike drives back to Albuquerque, he encounters Walt and Jesse, who remind Mike that the security camera footage from the lab can implicate both Mike and them, and ask for his aid in destroying it. Mike tells them the recordings were stored on Gus' laptop, which is now in police custody. He aids Walt and Jesse to build and employ an electromagnet that wipes the laptop's data. This inadvertently leads the police to discover hidden account numbers and access codes for the money Gus deposited offshore to be used to pay the members of his organization for their silence. They seize the accounts, making it likely that Gus' former employees will reveal Mike, Jesse, and Walt to the police.

Mike initially refuses Walt and Jesse's offer to join their operation, but after learning about the accounts being seized, including his own, and learning of Lydia's attempts to dispose of him and the men, Mike agrees to join. The new plan has Jesse and Walt producing meth in a mobile lab operated inside the tented homes of a fumigation company's customers. When Lydia suspects the DEA is tracking the methylamine Madrigal supplies, she provides Mike, Walt, and Jesse with information on a train that includes a tanker car of methylamine. They arrange to steal a large quantity without detection, but Todd Alquist, an employee of the fumigation company who aids in the robbery, shoots and kills a young boy who witnessed it. Wanting no more part of this brutality, Mike and Jesse decide to sell their share of the methylamine to Declan, a drug dealer from Phoenix. During a conversation about leaving the business, Mike gives Jesse the idea of starting over a new life in Alaska.

Walt refuses to leave the business and instead conducts a plan to let Declan distribute his own meth, while still giving Mike his buy-out share, which Declan agrees to. Mike agrees to continue paying Gus' former employees from his share of the methylamine sale in order to ensure their continued silence. The DEA identifies Mike's connection to Gus, but he removes evidence from his home and hides getaway money in a "go bag" at the airport, so a police search of his home turns up nothing. The police identify the attorney Mike has been using to make the payments to Gus' former employees, then locate the money he has been saving for Stacey and Kaylee. Intending to flee, Mike asks Saul to retrieve his go bag. Walt retrieves it instead, and meets with Mike. Intending to have Mike's associates killed in prison to protect his identity, Walt demands their names in exchange for the bag. Mike refuses and chastises Walt, pointing out that he is responsible for the difficult situation they are in as he had killed Gus in the first place. In revenge, Walt shoots him with the gun from the go bag. After following a mortally wounded Mike to the edge of a river, Walt realizes he could have simply asked Lydia for the names. As Walt begins to apologize, Mike stops him, saying "Shut the fuck up, and let me die in peace", before collapsing and dying by the riverbank. Walt and Todd then secretly dissolve his body in acid.

=== El Camino ===
Mike appears briefly in a flashback in the opening scene of the film El Camino: A Breaking Bad Movie. In a discussion that takes place shortly before Mike and Jesse leave Walt's meth business, Jesse asks Mike where he would go if he could start over. Mike says if he was younger, he would go to Alaska, an idea Jesse finds appealing. Jesse expresses a desire to make amends for past wrongdoing, but Mike cautions that starting over would make that impossible.

=== Madrigal Electromotive Security Training ===
Similar to the series of fictional employee training videos used during season three of Better Call Saul, AMC posted a series of ten short videos entitled Madrigal Electromotive Security Training to YouTube and its social media accounts during the run of season four of Better Call Saul. The videos feature a mix of live-action footage of Banks portraying Mike in providing training to new security employees of Madrigal and animated segments. The series had been nominated for the Primetime Emmy Award for Outstanding Short Form Comedy or Drama Series, but the nomination was pulled by the Academy of Television Arts & Sciences after they discovered the episodes were too short for the category, stating "This decision is in no way a diminishment of the quality of Better Call Saul Employee Training or Mr. Banks' performance in it".

== Reception ==
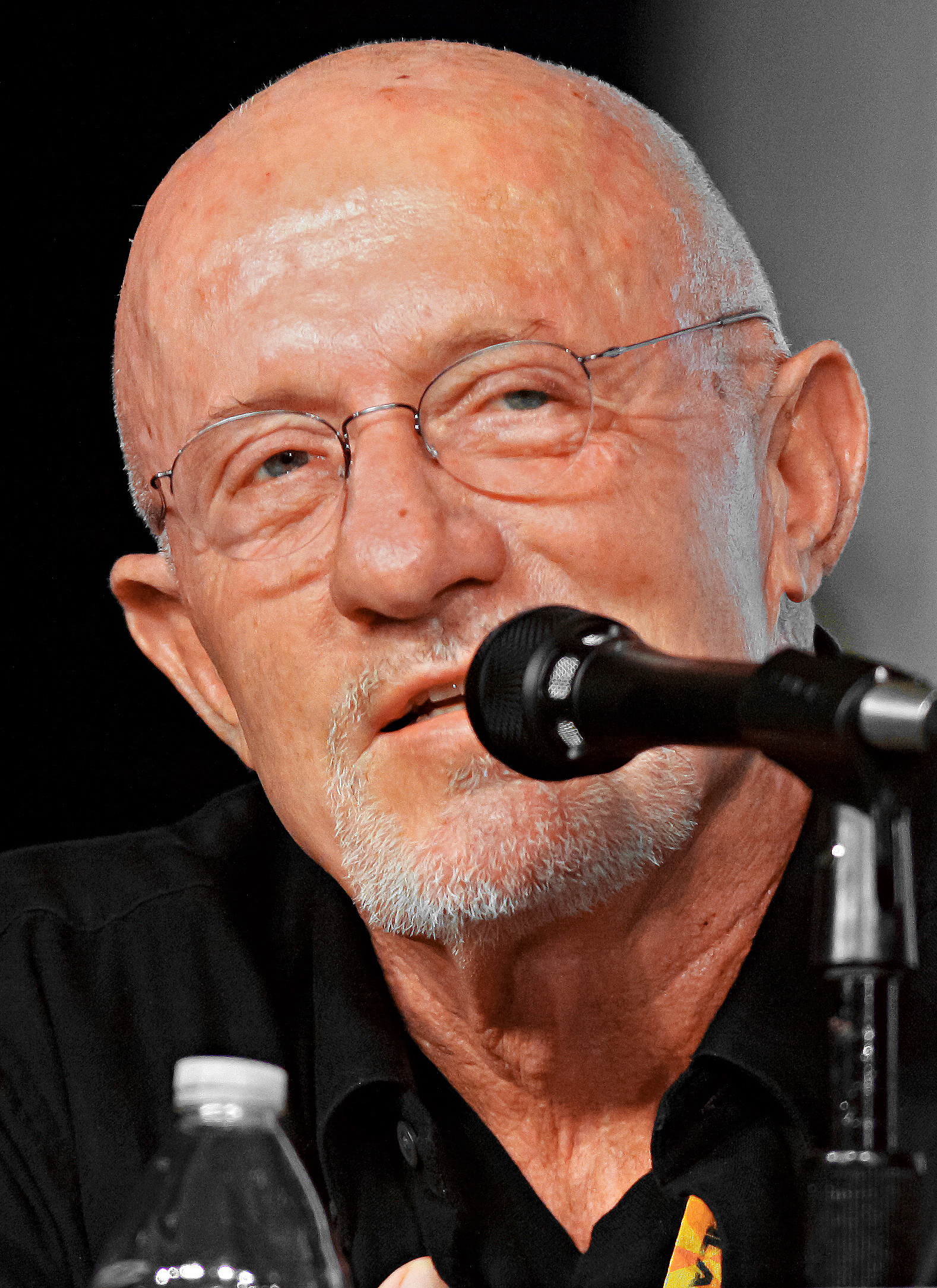
Jonathan Banks portrays Mike Ehrmantraut in both Breaking Bad and Better Call Saul

The Breaking Bad fifth season episode "Say My Name", which ends with Walt killing Mike, received critical acclaim, with many critics singling out Jonathan Banks and Bryan Cranston for particular praise. The episode is recognized by many television critics as one of the best in the series, with TV Fanatic's Matt Richenthal giving "Say My Name" a five-star rating, and calling it "one of the best in series history." Seth Amitin of IGN gave the episode a 9 out of 10 rating, calling it "mind-blowing", but stating that "I hate to see Mike go out like that. He deserved more. I literally can't give this higher than a 9.0, it was just too sad of an ending." Alan Sepinwall of HitFix thought the episode was "a mostly tremendous episode of a drama", adding the death of Mike "is just a gorgeous, devastating scene", but he was unimpressed by the plotting that led to Mike showing any trust for Walt in that situation, writing that it was a contrived way to ensure that Walt would be in a position to kill Mike per the requirements of the overall show story.

Jonathan Banks has received several awards and nominations for his portrayal as Mike Ehrmantraut in both Breaking Bad and Better Call Saul. In 2012, he received a Screen Actors Guild Award nomination for Outstanding Performance by an Ensemble in a Drama Series for his role in Breaking Bad. In 2013, he received a Critics' Choice Television Award nomination for Best Supporting Actor in a Drama Series, a Primetime Emmy Award nomination for Outstanding Supporting Actor in a Drama Series, and a Saturn Award for Best Supporting Actor on Television.

In 2015, he received a Critics' Choice Television Award for Best Supporting Actor in a Drama Series and a Primetime Emmy Award nomination for Outstanding Supporting Actor in a Drama Series for Better Call Saul. In 2016, he received a Satellite Award nomination for Best Supporting Actor – Series, Miniseries or Television Film and a Primetime Emmy Award nomination for Outstanding Supporting Actor in a Drama Series. In 2017, he received a Primetime Emmy Award nomination for Outstanding Supporting Actor in a Drama Series and a Satellite Award nomination for Best Supporting Actor – Series, Miniseries or Television Film. In 2019, he received another Primetime Emmy nomination for Outstanding Supporting Actor in a Drama Series.
