= Carrot and Stick =

- Better Call Saul episode
- Promotional poster
- Episode no.: Season 6 Episode 2
- Directed by: Vince Gilligan
- Written by: Thomas Schnauz; Ariel Levine
- Cinematography by: Paul Donachie
- Editing by: Skip Macdonald
- Original air date: April 18, 2022
- Running time: 61 minutes

Guest appearances
- Ed Begley Jr. as Clifford Main; Javier Grajeda as Juan Bolsa; Ray Campbell as Tyrus Kitt; Julie Ann Emery as Betsy Kettleman; Jeremy Shamos as Craig Kettleman; Jessie Ennis as Erin Brill; Jeremiah Bitsui as Victor; Luis Moncada as Marco Salamanca; Daniel Moncada as Leonel Salamanca; Katerina Tannenbaum as Amber; Poppy Liu as Jo; Mark Margolis as Hector Salamanca

Episode chronology
← Previous "Wine and Roses"	Next → "Rock and Hard Place"
- Better Call Saul season 6

"Carrot and Stick" is the second episode of the sixth season of Better Call Saul, the spin-off television series of Breaking Bad. Vince Gilligan directed the episode written by Thomas Schnauz and Ariel Levine. The episode aired back-to-back with "Wine and Roses" on April 18, 2022, on AMC and AMC+. In several countries outside the United States and Canada, the episode premiered on Netflix the following day.

In the episode, Nacho Varga comes face-to-face with the cartel while Jimmy McGill and Kim Wexler involve Betsy and Craig Kettleman in their plan to ruin Howard Hamlin's life. "Carrot and Stick" features the return of Julie Ann Emery and Jeremy Shamos as the Kettlemans, who reprise their roles from the first season, along with the first chronological appearance of an inflatable prop from Breaking Bad. Gilligan's approach as director to minimizing the dialogue and conveying information visually proved difficult to achieve. The scenes in the motel where Nacho is hiding required several stunts, a majority of which actor Michael Mando performed himself.

"Carrot and Stick" was met with critical acclaim for Gilligan's direction and Mando's performance as well as its tension, cinematography, and action sequence. An estimated 1.16 million viewers saw the episode during its first broadcast on AMC.

== Plot ==
Mike Ehrmantraut and Gus Fring's men enter Nacho Varga's home and pay his girlfriends to leave town. They break into Nacho's safe and remove the cash and the fake Canadian IDs Nacho had made for himself and his father Manuel. Victor delivers a duplicate safe, into which Mike places the cash, an envelope, and Nacho's fake ID. Juan Bolsa and Gus meet with Hector Salamanca and promise to avenge Lalo Salamanca's death, but Hector's demeanor convinces Gus that Lalo is alive. Juan and his men break into the duplicate safe and find the envelope, which contains the phone number of Nacho's motel and details of an offshore bank account paid into from Peru.

Nacho realizes he is being surveilled and sneaks out of his room to confront the watcher. Nacho confirms the watchman is reporting to Gus and realizes Gus has betrayed him to the cartel. A cartel team including the Cousins arrives and a gunfight breaks out. One team member nearly shoots Nacho, but the Cousins kill him and tell the others that they need Nacho alive. Nacho escapes in a stolen truck. Mike proposes to lead a team to Mexico to track Nacho down, but Gus wants to force Nacho to reveal himself by holding Manuel hostage, which Mike refuses to do. Mike and Tyrus engage in a standoff that ends when Mike receives a call from Nacho. (Note: Nacho's side of the call is depicted in the following episode, "Rock and Hard Place".)

Jimmy McGill meets with the Kettlemans, now proprietors of a shady tax preparation service, and cons them into believing they have grounds to sue Howard Hamlin for ineffective counsel because Howard supposedly used cocaine when representing Craig. As Jimmy and Kim Wexler intended, the Kettlemans ask Clifford Main to represent them. Cliff refuses due to a conflict of interest, so the Kettlemans offer the case to several other attorneys. The other lawyers all decline, but Jimmy and Kim succeed in perpetuating the rumor that Howard is using cocaine. Jimmy later attempts to bribe the Kettlemans to keep silent about their role in smearing Howard. They refuse the cash, so Kim coerces them by threatening to reveal their scam to the IRS. Jimmy disappoints Kim by giving the Kettlemans the cash anyway before he leaves. A car with an unknown driver follows Jimmy and Kim as they drive away.

== Production ==
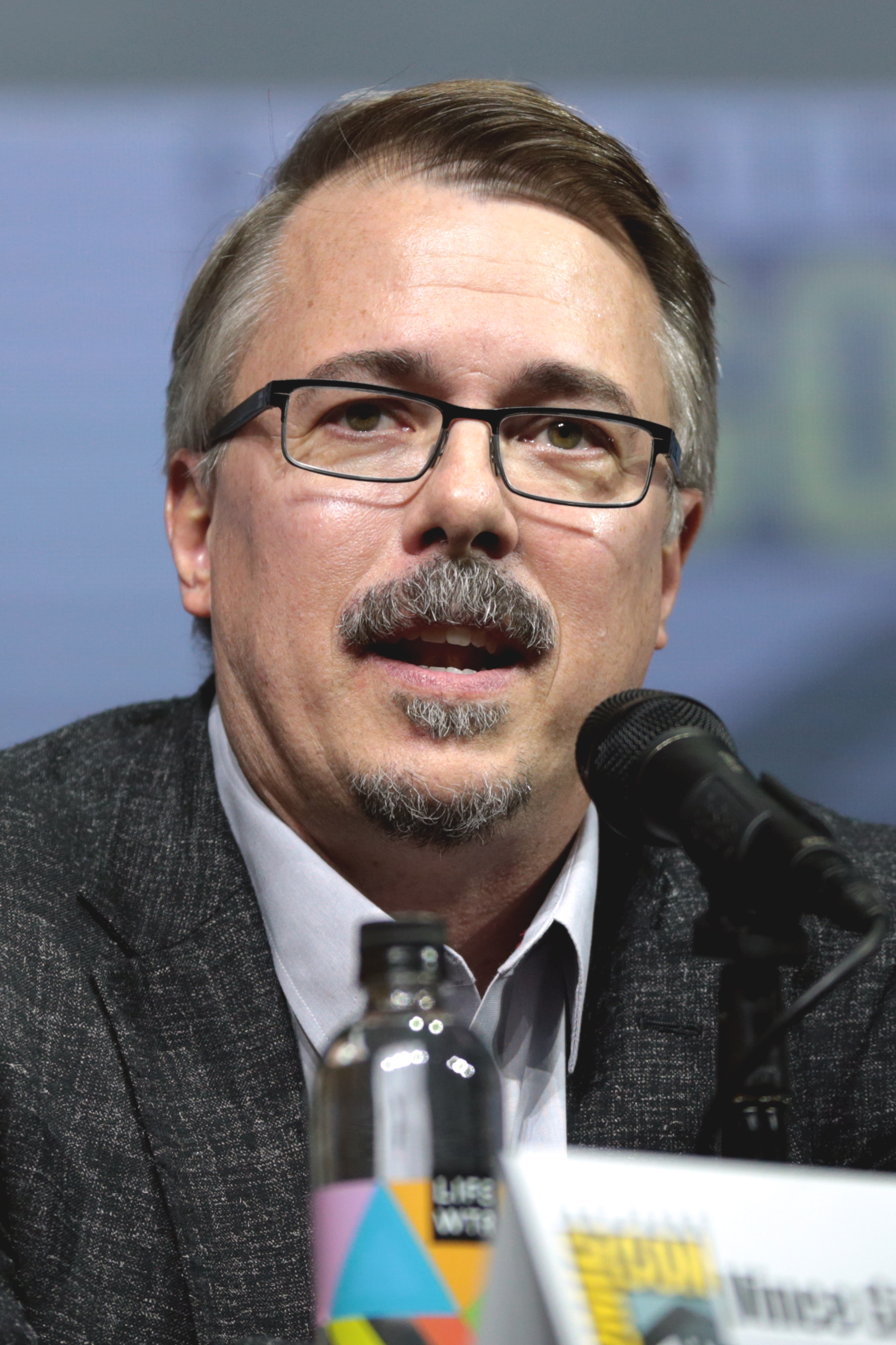
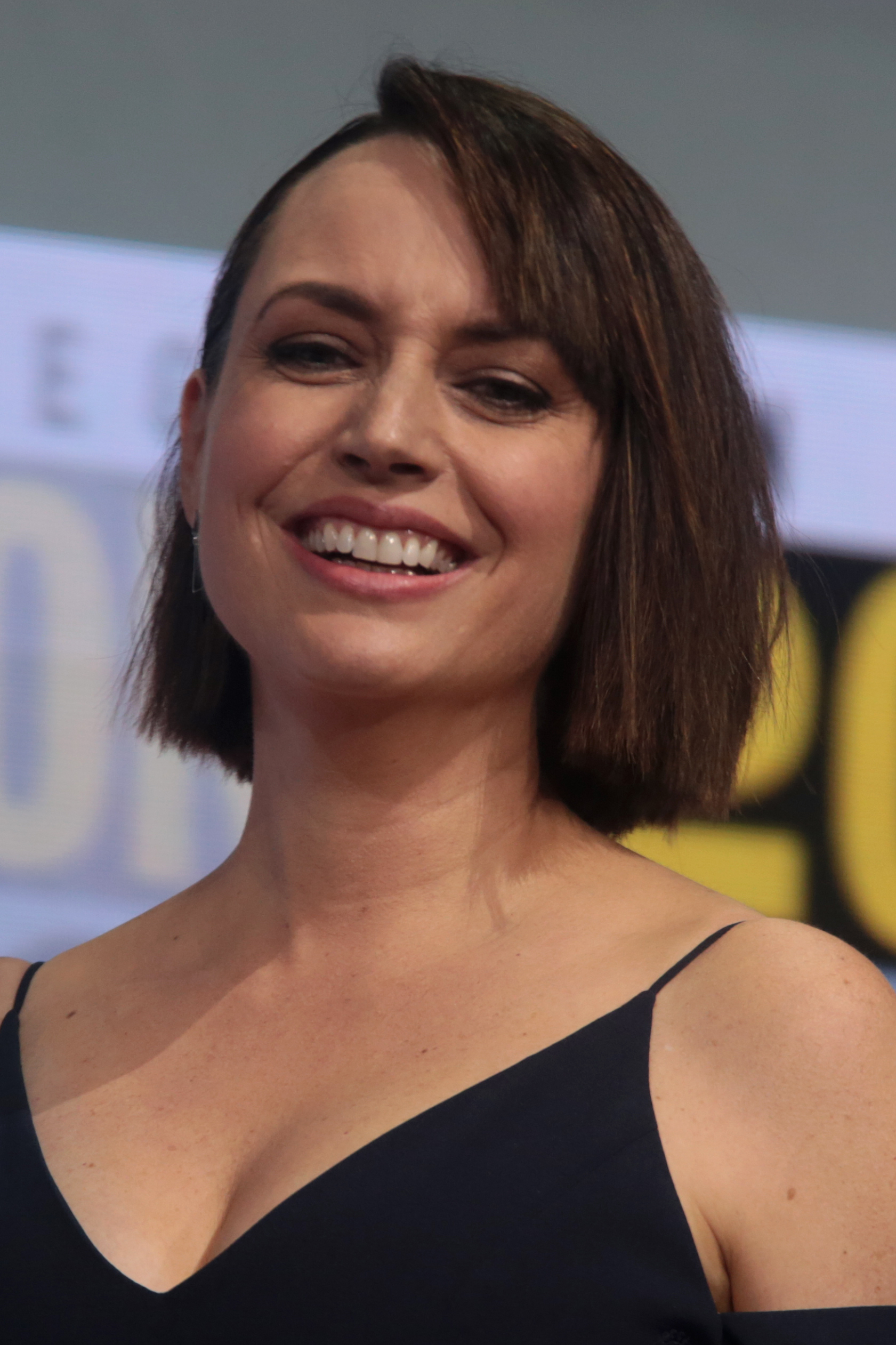
"Carrot and Stick" was directed by series co-creator Vince Gilligan (left). Actress Julie Ann Emery (right) reprised her first season role as Betsy Kettleman.

Series co-creator Vince Gilligan directed the episode written by Thomas Schnauz and Ariel Levine. Schnauz wrote the cold open and scenes that took place after Gus learns that Lalo is alive while Levine wrote everything in between. "Carrot and Stick" features the return of Julie Ann Emery and Jeremy Shamos as Betsy and Craig Kettleman, who made their debut in the first season. Though "Bingo" marked their last series appearance, the two characters appeared in several pieces of promotional material, including two short films and a podcast. The idea to bring the characters back was discussed for a long time; Emery said co-creator Peter Gould told them several times they were working on a sensible way to have them return. Gould said the Kettlemans would be the first of several characters to return to the series in the sixth season.

The tax preparation scam in the episode was inspired by Gould's wife, who was the victim of fraud when someone filed a tax return in her name to claim a refund. The episode marks the first chronological appearance of the inflatable Statue of Liberty that is eventually shown atop Saul's office in Breaking Bad; it is first used to advertise the Kettlemans's tax preparation business. One risk during filming was the possibility that the strong winds would destroy the inflatable, which Gilligan said was the only one available in the entire United States. As a result, balloon handlers were hired to maintain it on set. "Carrot and Stick" also features the "Battle Hymn of the Republic" playing inside the Kettlemans's office; the patriotic song is played in Saul's office in "Blood Money", an episode from the fifth season of Breaking Bad.

Actor Michael Mando performed the majority of the stunts for his character, Nacho, except for jumping out of the motel window and driving the truck when it collided with another vehicle. The window jump was performed by stuntman Victor Lopez. It required two takes, something Gilligan rarely does to minimize the risk of injury. Gilligan thought the first take was too perfect and looked like a "superhero landing", so he asked Lopez to do it again and "make it look not so good". Lopez agreed and even suggested adding a limp to his run after the landing, which Gilligan thought was a nice touch. Mando called the work "incredibly physical. It's excruciatingly emotional, and psychologically, you're just hitting every note on the piano. It was just such an amazing rollercoaster ride." The motel sequences were shot in two locations. The scenes in the interior of Nacho's room were shot in a studio while the exterior scenes were filmed on location. While filming Nacho's escape from the motel room, Mando and Gilligan would take turns bashing the air conditioning unit. A shot during the shootout, where the camera seemingly goes through the windshield of Nacho's truck, was the idea of cinematographer Paul Donachie. Gilligan was initially hesitant in shooting it but accepted the fact that the sequence needed a lot of shots from various angles. The shot was done practically; the crew spent some time figuring out the logistics and used a windshield that was sawed in half. The shootout took two to three days to film.

Gilligan said it was difficult to convey information visually when trying to minimize the dialogue, especially during Nacho's scenes. He wanted the watchman to be smart in concealing his location. One moment in the episode has Nacho looking out of his room window and catching a glint of light and a small amount of movement from the watchman. A young production assistant was hired to double as the watchman and create the subtle movement. Since he was not able to see what the camera was recording, the shot was difficult to film. At one point, due to frustration, Gilligan replaced the young man and tried to do it himself with the help of a wireless "Lollipop" screen that allowed him to see the camera's point of view. He, however, was not able to get it right either. The shot ultimately took over 200 takes to capture.

== Reception ==
=== Critical response ===
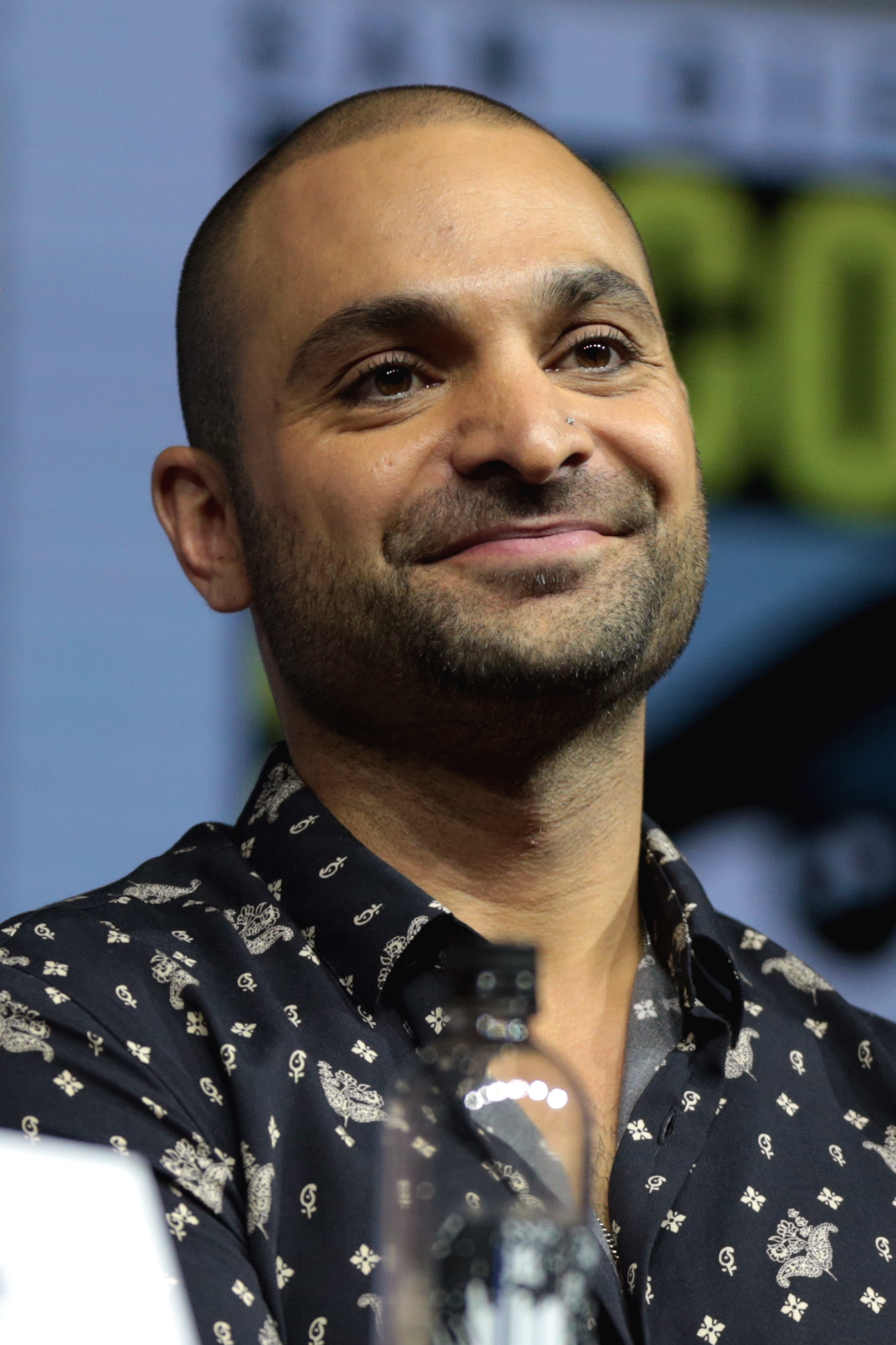
Critics praised Michael Mando for his performance in "Carrot and Stick".

On the review aggregator website Rotten Tomatoes, 100% of six reviews are positive, with an average rating of 9.7/10. Gilligan's direction and Mando's performance as Nacho were praised by critics. The A.V. Club's Kimberly Potts graded the episode with an "A" and said it featured the "most hold-your-breath action sequence" of all time since the shootout in Breaking Bad's "One Minute". Steve Greene from IndieWire was less positive of other parts of the episode. He saw Lalo's absence and the episode's focus on Gus, Jimmy, and Kim as Better Call Saul "shrewdly muddying the waters a little bit." Nonetheless, Greene praised the scenes with Nacho for their tension, atmosphere, editing, direction, and cinematography. David Segal of The New York Times described the episode as "superb and stressful" and said it was a "study in damage control, overseen by a man [Gus] who seems uncharacteristically ruffled and uncertain about what to do." Segal also said the shootout scene was "expertly staged" by Gilligan and that Rhea Seehorn's performance as Kim provided an opportunity for her to "demonstrate an almost thuggish toughness." Scott Tobias, writing for Vulture, compared the motel sequences to the Spaghetti Westerns of Sergio Leone, including Once Upon a Time in the West (1968). He also gave positive notes to the level of detail in the episode's opening scene, calling it "one big reason Better Call Saul stands apart from other shows."

=== Ratings ===
An estimated 1.16 million viewers watched "Carrot and Stick" during its first broadcast on AMC on April 18, 2022. According to AMC, the two-episode premiere generated over half a million engagements across social platforms including Twitter and Facebook, an increase of more than 60% compared to "Magic Man", the premiere of the show's fifth season. Social analytics tracker ListenFirst said a 10-hour national trend on Twitter made the show the "#1 television drama in social engagement, organic search, conversation, and content shares." The two-episode premiere also resulted in the biggest day of new subscriber sign-ups for AMC+.

=== Accolades ===
Award	Category	Nominee(s)	Result	Ref.
Golden Reel Awards	Outstanding Achievement in Sound Editing – Broadcast Long Form Effects / Foley	Nick Forshager, Kathryn Madsen, Matt Temple, Marc Glassman, Gregg Barbanell, and Alex Ullrich	Nominated	
Hollywood Professional Association Awards	Outstanding Color Grading – Episode or Non-Theatrical Feature	Keith Shaw	Nominated	
Primetime Creative Arts Emmy Awards	Outstanding Sound Editing for a Comedy or Drama Series (One Hour)	Nick Forshager, Kathryn Madsen, Jane Boegel-Koch, Matt Temple, Marc Glassman, Jeff Cranford, Jason Tregoe Newman, Gregg Barbanell, and Alex Ullrich	Nominated	
Primetime Creative Arts Emmy Awards	Outstanding Sound Mixing for a Comedy or Drama Series (One Hour)	Larry Benjamin, Kevin Valentine, and Phillip W. Palmer	Nominated	

== Lawsuit ==
Liberty Tax filed a lawsuit against AMC and the production of Better Call Saul in August 2022 due to the appearance of the Kettleman's tax service. The lawsuit states that Liberty's trademarks were violated and that the episode gave the appearance that their services were fraudulent.
