= Rock and Hard Place =

- Better Call Saul episode
- Promotional poster
- Episode no.: Season 6 Episode 3
- Directed by: Gordon Smith
- Written by: Gordon Smith
- Cinematography by: Marshall Adams
- Editing by: Joey Reinisch
- Original air date: April 25, 2022
- Running time: 47 minutes

Guest appearances
- Javier Grajeda as Juan Bolsa; Ray Campbell as Tyrus Kitt; Luis Moncada as Marco Salamanca; Daniel Moncada as Leonel Salamanca; Lavell Crawford as Huell Babineaux; Jeremiah Bitsui as Victor; Juan Carlos Cantu as Manuel Varga; Julie Pearl as Suzanne Ericsen; Mark Margolis as Hector Salamanca

Episode chronology
| ← Previous "Carrot and Stick" | Next → "Hit and Run" |
- Better Call Saul season 6

"Rock and Hard Place" is the third episode of the sixth season of Better Call Saul, the spin-off television series of Breaking Bad. It was written and directed by Gordon Smith. The episode aired on April 25, 2022, on AMC and AMC+. In several countries outside the United States and Canada, the episode premiered on Netflix the following day.

In the episode, Nacho Varga is forced to choose sides while on the run from the cartel. Meanwhile, Jimmy McGill questions his reputation as a lawyer when he involves his friend Huell Babineaux in his scheme to ruin Howard Hamlin's life.

Filming for the episode took place between April and May 2021. Actor Michael Mando, who plays Nacho, described his character's journey and the allusions in the episode to the ancient legend of Orpheus and Eurydice, practices in the Aztec and Mayan cultures, and the religious motif of weighing a person's soul. A series of misfortunes arose in the process of shooting the final scenes, such as Mando having to be rushed to the hospital after severely cutting his finger and a sandstorm hitting the set. Smith's approach as director was to meet audience expectations and focus on maximizing the tension in the episode's finale.

"Rock and Hard Place" was met with critical acclaim for its themes, story, Smith's direction, and Mando's performance. It marked the final appearance in the series for Mando (Nacho Varga). An estimated 1.16 million viewers saw the episode during its first broadcast on AMC.

== Plot ==
=== Opening ===
The camera pans over a small patch of desert before a storm. Rain begins to fall while the camera pans past a blue flower, then settles on a piece of broken glass and discarded zip-ties.

=== Main story ===
The truck Nacho Varga is driving after his escape breaks down. He conceals himself in an abandoned oil tanker until the Cousins move on with their search. The next day, he cleans himself at a mechanic's shop and makes a farewell call to his father, Manuel. He calls Mike Ehrmantraut, asks to speak to Gus Fring, and offers to surrender as long as his father is protected. (Note: Mike and Gus' side of the call was depicted in the preceding episode, "Carrot and Stick".) Gus' men smuggle Nacho into the U.S., and Mike administers a beating so it appears Nacho was captured. Mike and Nacho review the plan for Nacho to absolve Gus of blame for Lalo's death. After confessing, Nacho will attempt to flee so Victor can kill him, guaranteeing the Salamancas will not torture him.

Jimmy McGill and Kim Wexler conspire to obtain duplicates of Howard Hamlin's car and vanity license plate as part of their plan to force a resolution of the Sandpiper case, but realize that actually obtaining access to his car is more feasible. Jimmy and Kim work with Huell Babineaux and another associate to obtain copies of Howard's car key and remote unlock button. Huell asks Jimmy why two legitimate lawyers would commit crimes, and Jimmy makes an unconvincing argument about doing wrong to accomplish a greater good. Prosecutor Suzanne Ericsen connects Jimmy to Lalo Salamanca and Nacho. She tells Kim that Lalo is dead, and asks Kim to persuade Jimmy to inform on the Salamancas.

Gus, Tyrus Kitt, and Victor meet with Juan Bolsa, Hector Salamanca, and the Cousins to hand Nacho over, while Mike trains his sniper rifle on the meeting location from a distance. (Note: Mike is in the same spot where he intended to kill Hector in "Klick".) As planned, Nacho claims he was paid by the Peruvian Los Odios cartel to help them kill Lalo. He then bolsters his confession by revealing that he tried to kill Hector by replacing his heart medication with fakes, but Gus saved him. (Note: As seen in "Lantern".) Nacho uses the piece of broken glass he retrieved from Gus' trash (Note: Gus breaking and cleaning up a drinking glass was depicted in the preceding episode, "Carrot and Stick".) to cut his restraints, seizes Bolsa's gun, and shoots himself in the head. As Gus and his men depart, the Cousins assist Hector to fire bullets into Nacho's lifeless body.

== Production ==
The episode was written and directed by co-executive producer Gordon Smith. "Rock and Hard Place" marked the death of longtime character Nacho Varga, played by Michael Mando, who had been with the series since the second episode. Series co-creators Vince Gilligan and Peter Gould and executive producer Melissa Bernstein first told Mando about his character's fate in the final months of 2020, a few months before filming began on the sixth season of Better Call Saul. Smith said the writers had decided early on that it was better for the series to conclude Nacho's storyline early on in the season instead of spending several episodes of him "on the run and getting out of jams". Earlier scenes in the episode, as Mando put it, were meant to symbolize "what life meant to this character, and what he was willing to stand up for."

Filming for the episode began in April 2021. The first scene that was shot was of Nacho pouring himself a drink and noticing the broken glass in Gus' trash, which had been thrown out in the previous episode "Carrot and Stick". The shot taken from the point of view of the trash can was meant to symbolize how fragmented the character was at that moment. Smith filmed a take of Mando without the effect and, two weeks later, projected the shot onto a screen, where they could adjust where the glass was and how it was fractured. The oil tanker scene was shot on location for the exterior and in a studio for the interior. Nacho's submergence in the oil, which was first discussed in December 2020, was filmed on a soundstage in May 2021. It was the last scene Mando filmed on Better Call Saul. Each take would last one to two minutes with Mando performing the stunt himself, using about 40 U.S. gallons (150 L) of a vegetable-based substance. Its thickness made it difficult for Mando to submerge, so he had to hold onto horizontal scaffolding poles nearby to pull himself under. Resetting the scene would take at least an hour. The set in the studio had to be flipped upside down every time the crew wanted to point the camera in a different direction so a crane could fit inside. The episode's cold open was shot simultaneously with the oil tanker scene on a different soundstage, where they added a 40 by 40 feet (12 by 12 m) patch of desert with a green screen in the background. It took two days to prepare and was shot using a motion control rig.

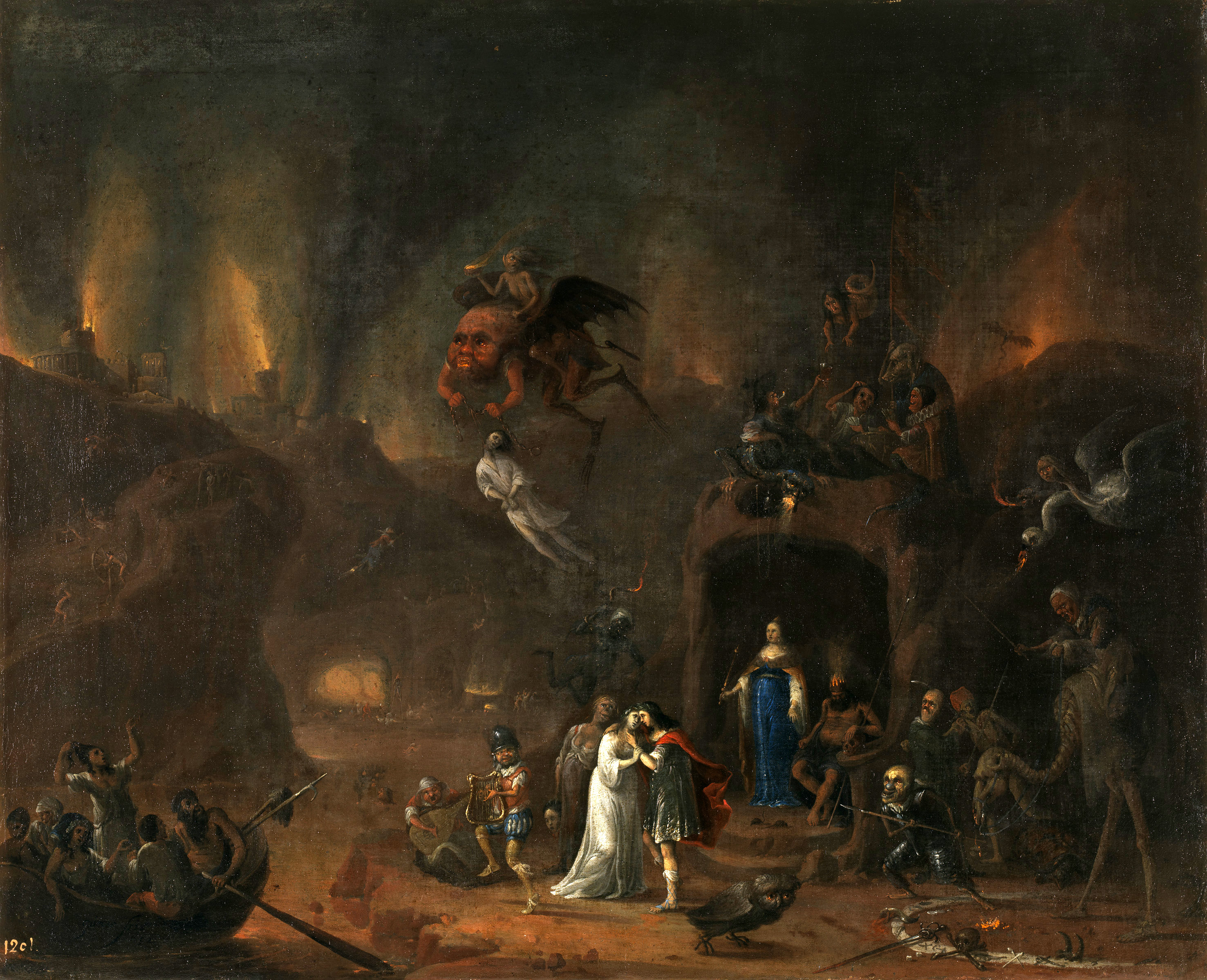
Mando compared Nacho's journey to the legend of Orpheus, a man who, in a literal sense, went through hell to rescue his loved one.

Mando compared Nacho's phone call to his father (played by Juan Carlos Cantu) to the legend of Orpheus and Eurydice, which details the story of a man between a rock and a hard place who voluntarily goes through Hades to save the person he loves on the condition that he can never see her again. "In that particular phone call," said Mando, "he's free, he's won, and he's looking into the sunset. But his heart turns around and asks his father to come with him, indirectly, subtextually. And his father says no. So he willingly walks back into the fire and trades his life for the life of his father." Assistant director Rich Sickler read Mando the lines to both of Nacho's phone calls in the episode. Mando said he did not shoot his side of the conversations with Cantu or Jonathan Banks, who plays Mike, on set because he thought it would be ideal if the actors did not see each other, much like the characters they played, to create a sense of disconnection. Cantu was not given access to the season's scripts, so, while filming, he actually did not know what Nacho had gone through, what he looked like, or where he was in the story. Mando agreed to be on set when Cantu shot his side of the dialogue.

Mando likened the moment of being interrogated before his death to being on trial and his heart being weighed. He called it the "first time he has no fear of any of these people ... completely willing to tell the story that will save his father, regardless of what anybody else thinks." He saw Nacho's confession to Hector as keeping his promise to his father in standing up to the cartel. He also said it was the moment Nacho and Mike's relationship broke apart as they made allegiances to different people, Nacho to his father and Mike to Gus. A Latin American documentary about the Aztecs and the Mayans, which said the victors of a sport would sacrifice themselves for their gods to bring rain, inspired Mando's performance. He viewed his character's suicide as a moment of no regrets because Nacho knew when and for what reason he was going to die: "For the first time in his life, he has a clear image of himself." Mando called the finale ominous because every other character present during Nacho's execution would eventually meet their own fates on Breaking Bad: "These are all dead men walking, watching the first man die." He also said that the purple flower that appears in the opening scene at the site of Nacho's suicide represents enlightenment from these cultures that comes from facing death.

The crew wore Nacho shirts and fake tear tattoos to commemorate Mando's last days on set. A series of misfortunes arose in the process of shooting the scenes in the desert. Off-set, Mando was rushed to the hospital after he severely cut his thumb and lost all sensation in his left hand. He was not able to start shooting his scenes for a week and a half. On the first day of filming the desert scenes, a sandstorm hit the set and production was paused; at the time they stopped, everyone's coverage had been shot but Mando's. Resuming the next day, Smith gave Mando a note that changed Mando's interpretation of Nacho's last words; Mando said he "realized that this was not an f-you speech, this was a speech that is filled with the underlying values and integrity of who Nacho really is, and where he'd like to see his community go". That night, Mando arrived home to discover that a tree struck by lightning had fallen in his driveway, blocking his entrance. Smith's approach as director was to meet audience expectations and focus on maximizing the tension in the scene despite the outcome seeming obvious in hindsight. Mando brought some of the character acting he did as the villainous Vaas Montenegro from the video game Far Cry 3 in the final scene, though he had to tone it back at Smith's request.

Smith compared Jimmy and Kim's relationship in "Rock and Hard Place" to an episode of Arrested Development where a character gets married after "a series of escalating dares". He noted their newly developed habit of smoking indoors as a sign that the "discipline is breaking down a little bit. It's a little bit chaotic and dangerous, but not terribly. Every step down a slippery slope is fine until you're at the bottom." The staircase sequence with the valet featured a number of wipe transitions. The crew found a parallelogram-shaped parking garage to shoot the scene. The staircase in the location had a hollow spot where they could fit the camera with a descender rig. Smith described it as "building a little elevator shaft for a camera body in this small, triangular hole that ran the length of the stairwell". During post-production, editing for the episode was completed by Joey Reinisch in his second solo editing credit on television.

== Reception ==
=== Critical response ===
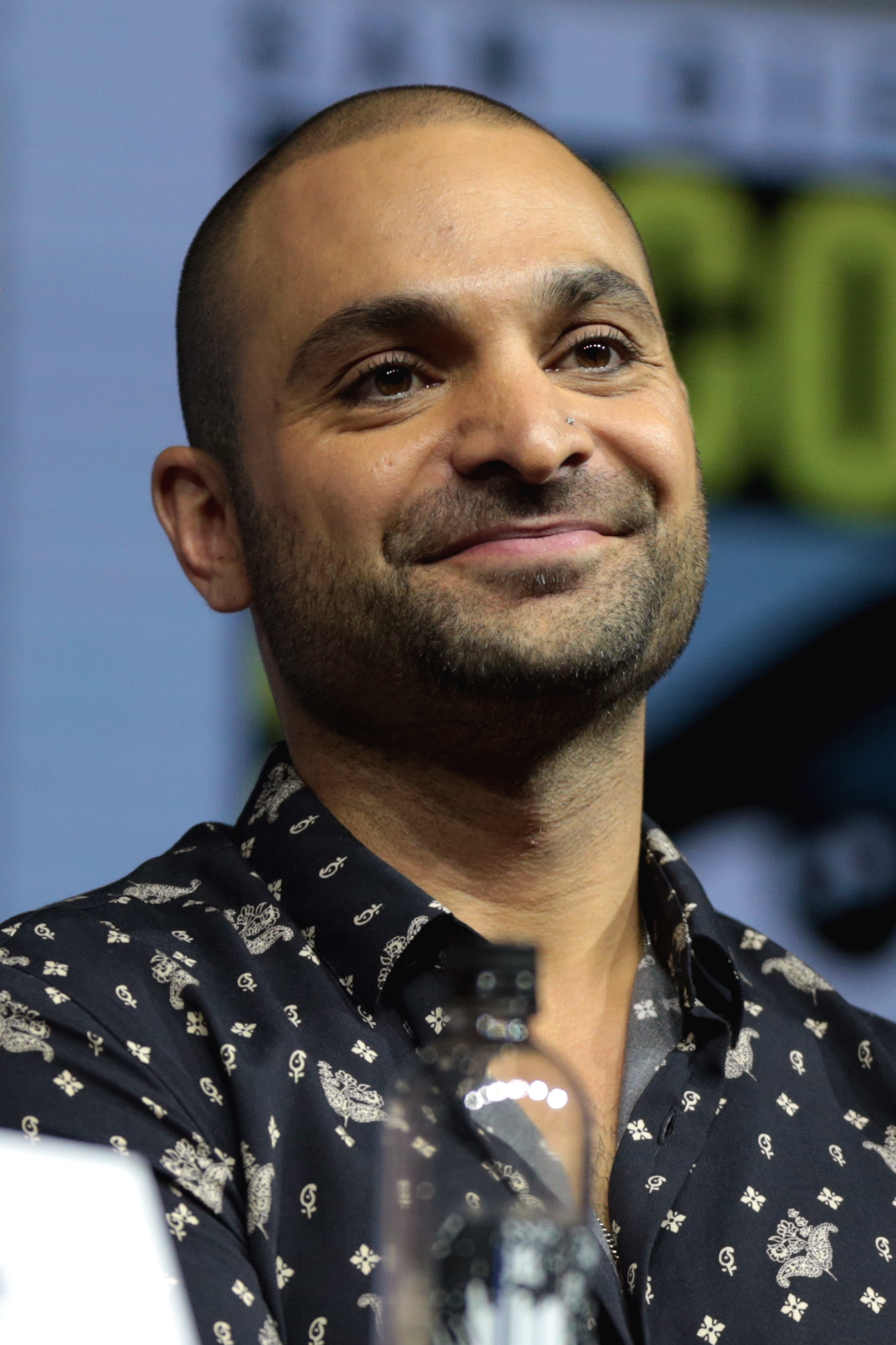
Mando made his final appearance in this episode. He received critical acclaim for his performance.

On the review aggregator website Rotten Tomatoes, 100% of five reviews are positive, with an average rating of 9.3/10. Mando's performance as Nacho received critical acclaim. Kaleena Rivera of Pajiba praised the actor's display of rage and the episode's buildup to the ending. The A.V. Club's Kimberly Potts said Mando's acting was deserving of an Emmy nomination. She also compared Nacho's last words to Walter White's confession to Jesse Pinkman in the Breaking Bad episode "Ozymandias" and gave positive notes to the performances of Giancarlo Esposito and Mark Margolis and the show's development of Nacho as a compelling character. David Segal of The New York Times saluted Smith's screenplay and direction and the production design. He similarly compared Nacho's life to that of Jesse's—both criminals who made "some terrible life choices" and were "over-punished for them"—adding, "It would have been great to see more of this stellar actor, but if you must leave a show, a more dramatic and affecting end is hard to imagine." Steve Greene, writing for IndieWire, said he enjoyed how the storylines shared similar themes on creating one's fate.

Alan Sepinwall of Rolling Stone complimented the episode's straightforward narrative and said Mando's performance was "fantastic throughout — so tired, so defeated, and yet so insistent about ending things on something resembling his own terms if he can. It is a tour de force, particularly the phone call sequence and Nacho staring down the Salamancas for the last time." TVLine named Mando the performer of the week ending on April 30, 2022. They called it "a beautifully moving episode that saw Mando hit new dramatic heights ... we could see the emotions welling up in Mando's eyes as his character's tragic fate began to settle in. ... Nacho may not have lived long enough to share the screen with Breaking Bad's Walt and Jesse — but with Mando's truly exceptional performance this week, he's more than earned the right to share the screen with anyone."

=== Ratings ===
An estimated 1.16 million viewers watched "Rock and Hard Place" during its first broadcast on AMC on April 25, 2022.
