= Wine and Roses =

- Better Call Saul episode
- Promotional poster
- Episode no.: Season 6 Episode 1
- Directed by: Michael Morris
- Written by: Peter Gould
- Cinematography by: Marshall Adams
- Editing by: Joey Reinisch
- Original air date: April 18, 2022
- Running time: 57 minutes

Guest appearances
- Ed Begley Jr. as Clifford Main; Javier Grajeda as Juan Bolsa; Ray Campbell as Tyrus Kitt; Rex Linn as Kevin Wachtell; Nigel Gibbs as Tim Roberts; Saidah Arrika Ekulona as ADA Gina Khalil; Luis Moncada as Marco Salamanca; Daniel Moncada as Leonel Salamanca; James Urbaniak as Norm Wakely; Rosemary Dominguez as Sylvia Ramos; Mark Margolis as Hector Salamanca

Episode chronology
← Previous "Something Unforgivable"	Next → "Carrot and Stick"
- Better Call Saul season 6

"Wine and Roses" is the first episode of the sixth season of Better Call Saul, the spin-off television series of Breaking Bad. Michael Morris directed the episode written by Peter Gould. It aired back-to-back with "Carrot and Stick" on April 18, 2022, on AMC and AMC+. In several countries outside the United States and Canada, it premiered on Netflix the following day.

In the episode, Nacho Varga goes into hiding after aiding in the attempted assassination of Lalo Salamanca, unaware of its failure. Meanwhile, Jimmy McGill and Kim Wexler proceed with their scheme to ruin Howard Hamlin's life.

The episode's cold open features a glimpse into the life of Jimmy during the events of Breaking Bad when he was better known as Saul Goodman. The sequence was inspired by the classic films Citizen Kane and Sunset Boulevard. It includes an instrumental version of the song "Days of Wine and Roses". The closing shot of the opening shows a callback to an episode from the second season of Better Call Saul. Gould said it was a nod to the ending of Citizen Kane and that he wanted the moment to symbolize Saul's true character.

"Wine and Roses" was met with critical acclaim for the direction, screenplay, and on-screen performances. An estimated 1.42 million viewers saw the episode during its first broadcast on AMC.

== Plot ==
=== Opening ===
In a flashforward, authorities remove possessions from Saul Goodman's opulent home. (Note: The flashforward is set during the Breaking Bad episode "Granite State" (2013), after Saul flees when his association with the drug lord Walter White is exposed.) As a cabinet is loaded onto a truck, Kim Wexler's souvenir tequila bottle stopper (Note: First seen in "Switch".) falls into the gutter.

=== Main story ===
Nacho Varga flees Lalo Salamanca's compound; Tyrus Kitt calls Nacho and directs him to a motel. Lalo arrives at the home of his tenants, Sylvia and Mateo, kills them, then moves Mateo's body to his house to be identified as his. Juan Bolsa calls Gus Fring and tells him that Nacho aided in killing Lalo and that the cartel has placed a bounty on him. Gus questions the circumstances, wondering why the hit team members are all dead if they succeeded in killing Lalo. Nacho reaches the motel room, where he finds a gun, cash, and a new cell phone. He calls Tyrus, who tells him to hide until it is safe to move. Nacho attempts to call Mike Ehrmantraut, who declines to answer.

The prosecutor and detective handling Lalo's murder case tell Jimmy the defendant's name, address, and supposed family are fake and question whether Jimmy is complicit. Jimmy threatens to file misconduct complaints and accidentally refers to Lalo by his real name. He explains away the error, but afterward silently berates himself.

Kim suggests that if Jimmy intends to practice law as Saul Goodman, upgrades to his home, car, and office are in order. They decide to follow through on Kim's plan to force a resolution of the Sandpiper case by ruining Howard Hamlin's reputation. Later, as Kim surveils Howard and Clifford Main during a round of golf, Jimmy attempts to sneak into the club's locker room and plant a bag resembling cocaine in Howard's locker. After causing a scene in a confrontation with Kevin Wachtell, Jimmy succeeds. Howard and Cliff find the fake drugs, which Howard explains away as being someone else's, but Cliff appears dubious.

Lalo intends to enter the United States, but before hiding in the coyotes' cargo truck, he calls Hector to reveal he is alive and that he believes Gus was responsible for the attack. Hector advises him to find proof the cartel will accept. Lalo realizes the proof is not in the U.S. and decides to stay. The coyotes refuse to return his money, so he kills them, returns the money of the others who paid to be smuggled, then uses the coyotes' pickup truck to drive away.

== Production ==
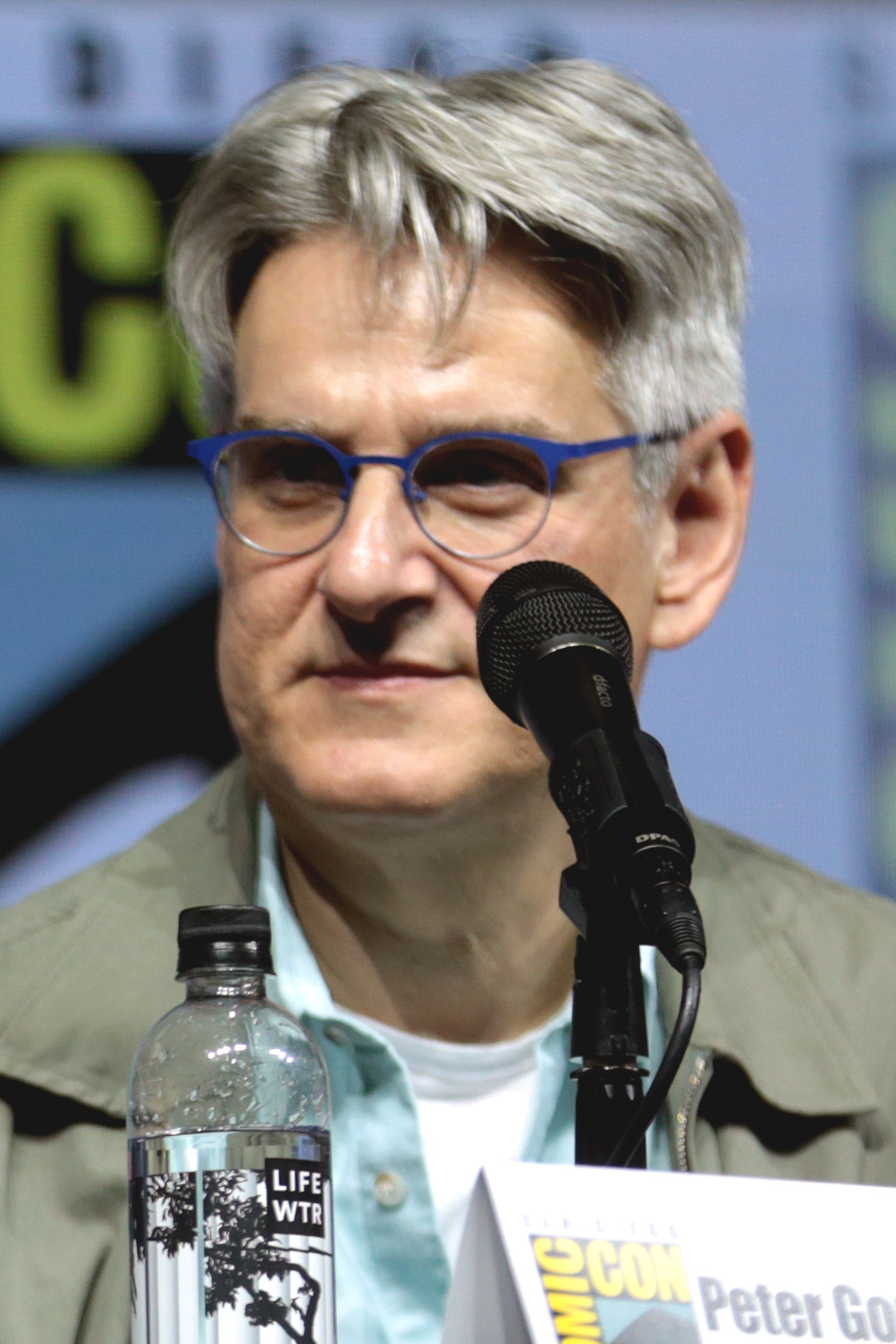
"Wine and Roses" was written by Better Call Saul co-creator Peter Gould.

"Wine and Roses" was directed by Michael Morris and written by Better Call Saul showrunner and co-creator Peter Gould. It is the first Better Call Saul season premiere that does not feature a flashforward of Jimmy McGill living under the alias Gene Takavic after the events of Breaking Bad. Instead, it shows a glimpse of his personal life during Breaking Bad, when he was better known as Saul Goodman. Gould said that since the season was 13 episodes, instead of the usual 10, the writing staff decided to wait until later in the season to show the Gene timeline. The opening scene was inspired by the classic films Citizen Kane (1941) and Sunset Boulevard (1950). It features several callbacks to previous episodes as well as later ones. The sequence was shot in Albuquerque in the house of a wealthy family in the casino business. The location was the crew's second choice. It was originally going to be set in the house Jimmy and Kim consider buying in the episode "50% Off" but it was deemed "too restrictive", leading to the change. Many of the actors playing the house cleaners were professional dancers from the same dance troupe, an idea that Morris and assistant director Rich Sickler came up with to give the sequence a "ballet-like precision". The scene was rehearsed on a Sunday and filmed during the next two days.

Production designer Denise Pizzini and her crew transformed the house to the point Gould said it did not "look exactly the way you see it portrayed". Portions of the bathroom were taken from a set built at Q Studios. The gold toilet in the room was a normal toilet that was painted gold and later repainted after Morris said it was "not gold enough". The Saul Goodman standee in the sequence was a photo Gould took himself of actor Bob Odenkirk while putting together a website of the character, back when they were filming the third season of Breaking Bad. A black book that is opened by one of the cleaners in the scene was later revealed to be Dr. Caldera's book of criminal contacts in the episode "Axe and Grind". The book's functioning deciphers were conceived by screenwriter Ariel Levine, assistant Valerie Chu, props assistant Claudia Azurmendi, assistant producer Jenn Carroll, showrunner's assistant Joanna Zhang, and script coordinator Kathleen Williams-Foshee. The pages shown in the scene were reportedly decoded and solved by a Reddit user in May 2022. The song that plays over the scene is a recording of the orchestra of Jackie Gleason playing "Days of Wine and Roses", a piece Gould selected because of how often he would listen to it while on his way to work.

The opening scene's first shot is of several ties falling into a pile, of which the first few are monochromatic and the last ones are colorful. Morris came up with the idea, which he said reminded him of a similar opening scene in Alice Doesn't Live Here Anymore (1974). The shot was recorded with a Photo-Sonics camera and filmed at 480 frames per second (FPS). It was originally three-quarters of a second; the broadcast played the recording back at 240 FPS so it lasted longer. It was completed with only practical effects. The ties were carefully selected by costume designer Jennifer Bryan and dispensed into frame by two conveyor belts, one on each side of the camera.

The opening scene's final shot is of the tequila bottle stopper, produced by the fictitious brand Zafiro Añejo, that Kim keeps as a souvenir in the episode "Switch" from the second season of Better Call Saul. The stopper was added to the scene through CGI to save time and give the crew control over where it was going to land and was added during post-production by Rodeo FX. The shot was challenging to film because it was the crew's last day in that location and they were running out of natural light. The shot is a nod to the ending of Citizen Kane, where the titular character's final words are explained by the trade name of his sled, "Rosebud", which no one notices. Morris said "the general approach to opening this season has a lot in common with that great sequence ending in the Rosebud reveal. The way that this sequence funnels into that one final image is deliberately reminiscent of that great, huge, what must have felt like a magical crane shot at the time, just going through the entire mansion." Gould said the inclusion of that shot "tells you, or it at least tells me, that even when Saul Goodman was at his lowest and he's advising Walter White to kill people, he still has that Zafiro stopper, so there's still some soul left in there somewhere. Maybe."

The episode includes an extreme close-up of an ant crawling on the finger of a dead body. Cinematographer Marshall Adams said the "ant was not being cooperative at all. He was the clumsiest ant I've ever seen. He was falling off the finger. He couldn't hold on. And then, all of a sudden, everything just happened to land perfectly in one take." Later on in the episode, Nacho (played by Michael Mando) hides in a pipe tunnel and drinks from the water coming out of it. The crew used an area behind the production studio to film the scene because a natural road was already built there. They dug the hole and put the pipe in it themselves, making sure it was sterilized and regularly cleaned. Adams said they had to be careful in making sure they were not leaving any dirt in the water so Mando could drink from it. A shot of Jimmy's bag going through a metal detector was filmed with a Blackmagic Pocket Cinema Camera. "The gaffer actually had to put a little green light in there, but it literally was strapping a monitor and a cable so that we could watch it go through," Adams said. The restaurant where Jimmy and Kim converse, El Camino Dining Room, is a real location and a nod to the Breaking Bad sequel film El Camino: A Breaking Bad Movie (2019). During post-production, editing for the episode was completed by Joey Reinisch in his first solo editing credit on television.

In the scene where Nacho enters a motel in Mexico, a woman can be seen watching an episode of Casados con hijos, the Argentine version of the sitcom Married... with Children, featuring actors Darío and Luisana Lopilato, despite "Wine and Roses" taking place in 2004 and Casados con hijos not premiering until 2005.

== Reception ==
=== Critical response ===
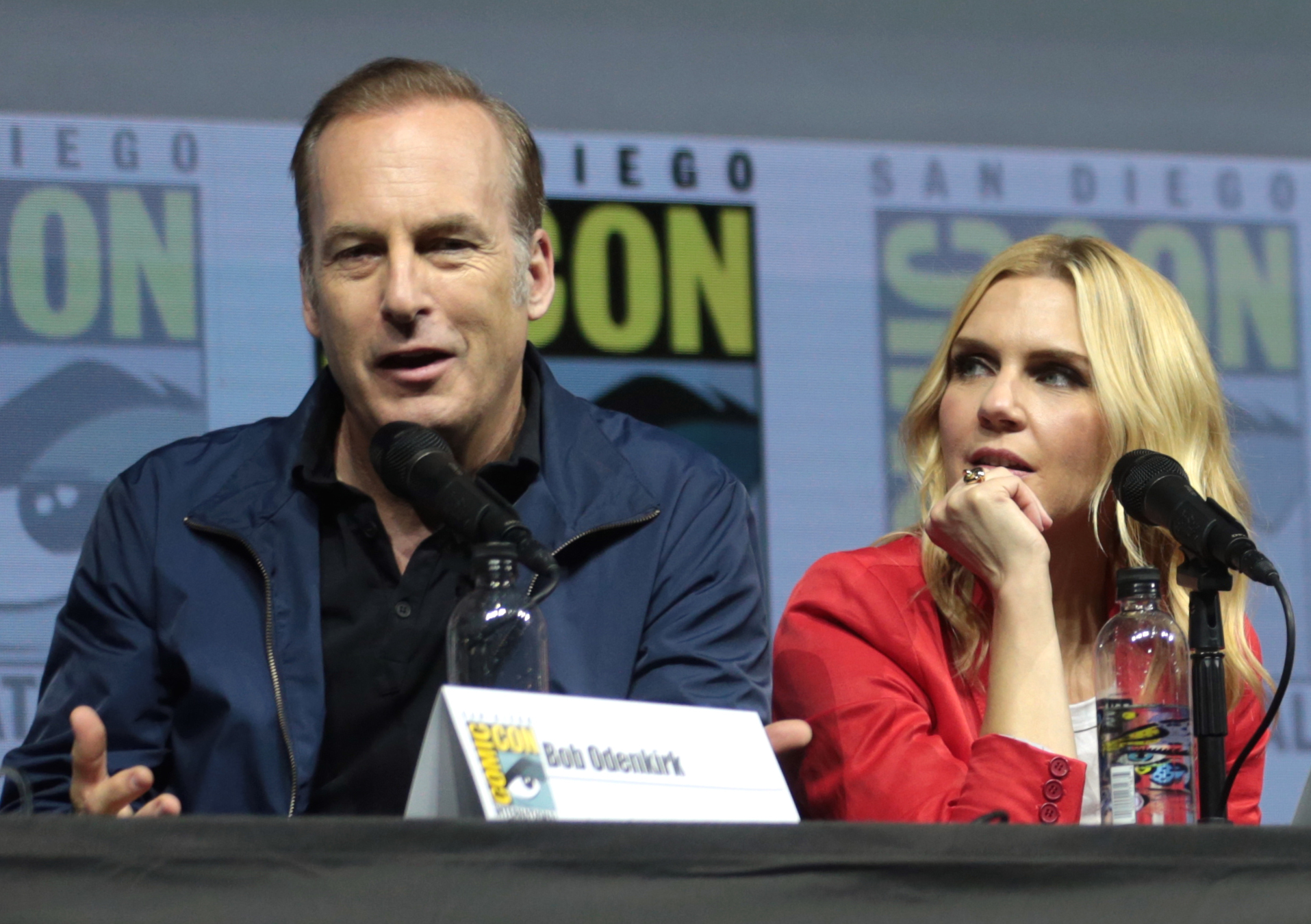
The performance of Bob Odenkirk and Rhea Seehorn received praise from critics.

On the review aggregator website Rotten Tomatoes, 100% of ten reviews are positive, with an average rating of 9.0/10. David Segal of The New York Times described the episode as "strong, twisty and gripping" and said the writing "must be hailed as a masterly curtain raiser, one that managed to pick up the story right where it was left, two years ago, and hurl it forward at a promising pace." Segal also praised Morris's direction in the opening scene but criticized Kim's con against Howard at the country club, calling it "dimmer and daffier than the rest of the show" and "pointlessly cruel". Reviewing "Wine and Roses" and "Carrot and Stick" together, The A.V. Club's Kimberly Potts graded them with an "A" and gave positive notes to Gould's screenplay and the performances of the cast, especially those of Rhea Seehorn as Kim and Michael Mando as Nacho.

Steve Greene, writing for IndieWire, said the first two episodes were "astonishingly short on false moves so far". He also noted Ed Begley Jr.'s acting as Clifford Main and the symbolism in Kim throwing away the "World's 2nd Best Lawyer" coffee mug, calling it a "a poetic bookend of sorts." IGN's Tara Bennett said Odenkirk and Seehorn "lead a fantastic cast who all continue to bring nuance to their characters, even when they embark upon some inhumane life choices. They all make balancing a story about morality, corruption, revenge, and love, with an overriding side mystery of what happens to a lawyer who wears terrible suits, look easy." IndieWire ranked "Wine and Roses" the eighth best TV episode of the year.

=== Ratings ===
An estimated 1.42 million viewers watched "Wine and Roses" during its first broadcast on AMC on April 18, 2022. It was the number one cable drama premiere of 2022 at the time of its airing. According to AMC, the two-episode premiere generated over half a million engagements across social platforms including Twitter and Facebook, an increase of more than 60% compared to "Magic Man", the premiere of the show's fifth season. Social analytics tracker ListenFirst said a 10-hour national trend on Twitter made the show the "#1 television drama in social engagement, organic search, conversation, and content shares." The premiere also resulted in the biggest day of new subscriber sign-ups for AMC+.
