= Hit and Run (Better Call Saul) =

- Better Call Saul episode
- Promotional poster
- Episode no.: Season 6 Episode 4
- Directed by: Rhea Seehorn
- Written by: Ann Cherkis
- Cinematography by: Paul Donachie
- Editing by: Chris McCaleb
- Original air date: May 2, 2022
- Running time: 43 minutes

Guest appearances
- Ed Begley Jr. as Clifford Main; David Ury as Spooge; Peter Diseth as DDA Bill Oakley; Julia Minesci as Wendy; Eileen Fogarty as Mrs. Nguyen; Victor Rivas Rivers as Howard's Psychologist

Episode chronology
← Previous "Rock and Hard Place"	Next → "Black and Blue"
- Better Call Saul season 6

"Hit and Run" is the fourth episode of the sixth season of Better Call Saul, the spin-off television series of Breaking Bad. Actress Rhea Seehorn directed the episode written by Ann Cherkis. The episode aired on May 2, 2022, on AMC and AMC+. In several countries outside the United States and Canada, the episode premiered on Netflix the following day.

In the episode, Jimmy McGill faces the repercussions of having defended Lalo Salamanca in court and Kim Wexler starts to believe she is being followed as they continue their plan to sabotage Howard Hamlin's career.

The episode was the television directorial debut of Seehorn, who plays Kim. "Hit and Run" was met with positive reviews for its direction, on-screen performances, cinematography, and pacing. An estimated 1.16 million viewers saw the episode during its first broadcast on AMC.

== Plot ==
Mr. and Mrs. Ryman return home after riding their bicycles through an Albuquerque suburb. Their house is revealed to be the operations center of people who are surveilling Gus Fring's home. Gus returns to his home and uses a tunnel system to enter the Ryman home, from which he oversees a widespread search of Albuquerque for Lalo Salamanca. Mike Ehrmantraut says no leads have been found, but Gus insists that Lalo is alive.

While Howard Hamlin visits his psychologist, Jimmy McGill disguises himself as Howard, uses his duplicate key to take Howard's car, and picks up Wendy at a motel. They drive past Kim Wexler and Clifford Main, and Jimmy pretends to force Wendy out of the car, making it appear to Cliff that Howard is frequenting prostitutes. (Note: Jimmy previously ran a similar con in "Wexler v. Goodman".) Jimmy returns the car just as Howard leaves his appointment. Kim drives Wendy back to the motel and Wendy alerts her to a nearby car, which she believes to be undercover police. Kim notices the same car continuing to follow her. While meeting pro bono clients at the El Camino Dining Room, Kim spots the car again and confronts the occupants, who drive away. Later, Mike reveals himself to her in the restaurant, saying that the men following her work for him, that Lalo may still be alive, and that Mike is having men monitor anyone Lalo may contact. Kim realizes Mike is the man who saved Jimmy's life in the desert (Note: As seen in "Bagman".) and asks why he told her, not Jimmy; Mike replies that she is "made of sterner stuff". As he leaves, she recognizes him as the former courthouse parking lot attendant.

Jimmy notices that he has become a pariah among the courthouse staff, which Bill Oakley explains is because Jimmy defended Lalo. Jimmy later discovers that his defense of Lalo has now made him popular among local criminals seeking representation from Saul Goodman. Mrs. Nguyen evicts Jimmy from the nail salon because of the high client volume, so Jimmy begins scouting for a new office. That night Kim meets Jimmy at a potential location for his new office (Note: This location becomes Saul Goodman's office in Breaking Bad.) and is still shaken by the possibility that Lalo is alive. Despite poor maintenance and other problems, Kim approves, citing its proximity to the county courthouse and jail, and Albuquerque's bail bonds offices. She and Jimmy leave for dinner, and Kim opts not to mention her meeting with Mike and Lalo's survival.

== Production ==
The episode was written by Ann Cherkis and directed by Rhea Seehorn, who plays Kim, marking Seehorn's television directorial debut. She became the first Better Call Saul cast member to direct an episode of the series; Giancarlo Esposito, who plays Gus, directed an episode of the sixth season as well. Seehorn said co-creators Vince Gilligan and Peter Gould and executive producers Melissa Bernstein and Thomas Schnauz had often promoted the idea of actors guest directing on Better Call Saul after actor Bryan Cranston directed some episodes of Breaking Bad. Editor Kelley Dixon recalled Seehorn visiting the editing room of Better Call Saul during the second or third season and sharing her desire to direct an episode. Seehorn said she was very observant of other directors on set, including John Shiban, Norberto Barba, Scott Winant, and Michael Slovis. Gilligan and Gould also gave her access to shot lists and she would work with frequent Better Call Saul director Michelle MacLaren to break down episodes. Seehorn was initially hesitant about asking for permission to direct the episode but found the courage to bring it up due to her relationship with the crew.

Michael Morris was the episode's producing director, Angie Meyer was the assistant director, and Paul Donachie was the cinematographer. The first scene that was shot for the episode was the nail salon scene, which Seehorn said made her nervous due to the number of crew members on set. She described the experience as a fun trial-by-fire. She said she received one piece of advice about being truthful when she did not know something: "Being full of crap, they'll see through it in a heartbeat. So there was a lot of, 'I don't know! That's a very good question! I'm gonna think about that!'" Gilligan and Gould told her that the job would be stressful but said that "as hard as it is ... just try and find some joy when you can. Be as present as you can and have some good times as well."

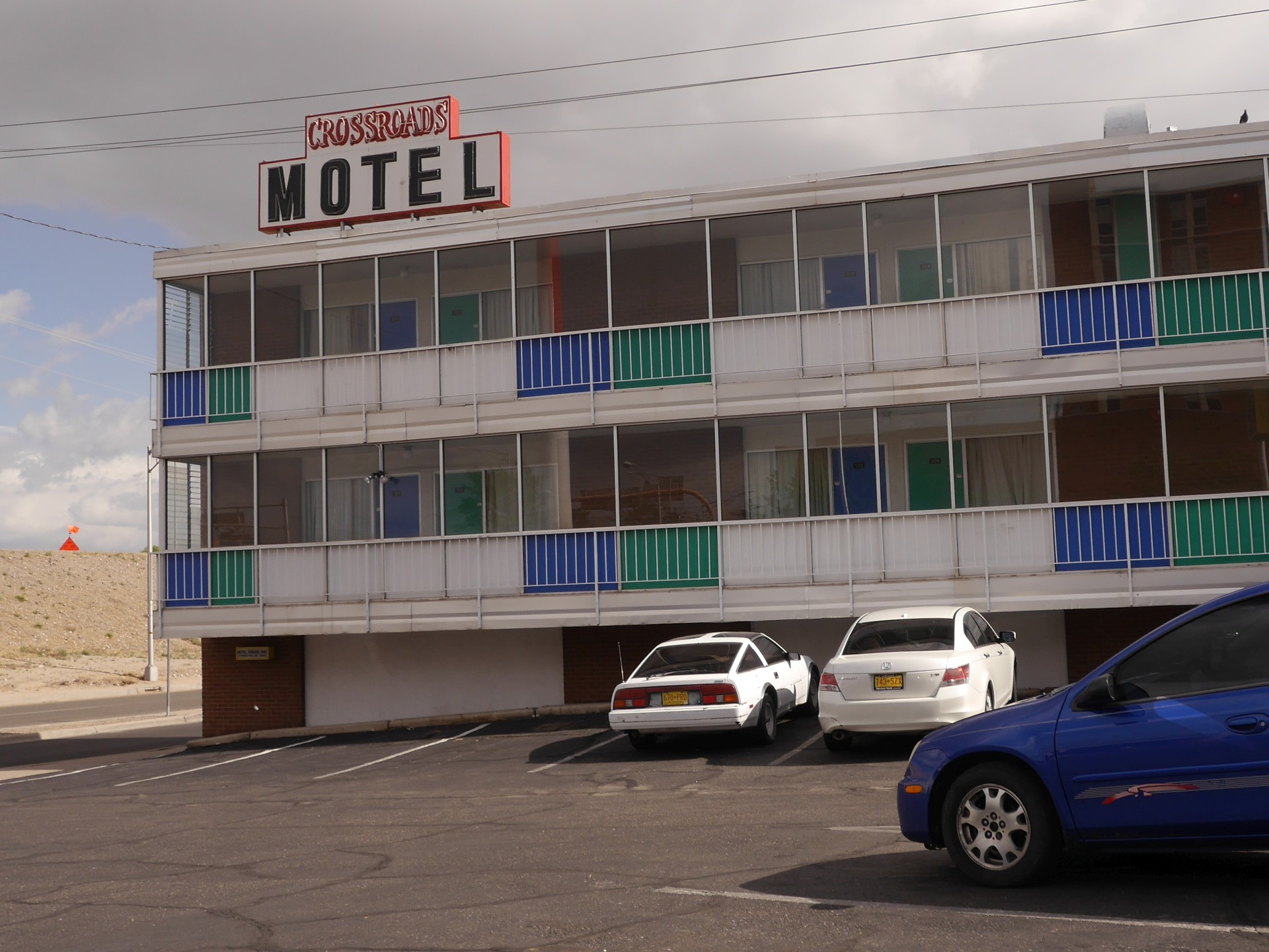
"Hit and Run" marks the first appearance of the Crossroads Motel in Better Call Saul.

Seehorn and Cherkis noted how the episode displayed intimate and vulnerable moments in a majority of the character's lives, from Howard's therapy session, Clifford Main's revealing his son has a drug problem, Gus being irritated with removing his concealed weapon, Bill Oakley's conversation with Jimmy about ethics, and Kim's initial realization that she is being followed. "Hit and Run" introduces several settings and characters from Breaking Bad, including the strip mall location of Saul Goodman's eventual office, the Crossroads Motel, and minor characters Spooge and Wendy, played respectively by David Ury and Julia Minesci. The strip mall location of Goodman's office had, since the end of Breaking Bad, been leased by a few sports bars, but by the time Better Call Saul was ready to shoot there, the property had become vacant. Seehorn took a detail-oriented approach as a director, working with Meyer and Donachie to storyboard the shots during the weekends. The episode's cinematography was rigorously considered: Seehorn made sure the point-of-view shots in the episode were only included if they moved the story forward, so as to avoid breaking audiences' immersion. The only scene Seehorn had to watch the playback of during filming was the scene with Kim and Clifford Main because the action was occurring behind her.

Married couple Joni and Kirk Bovill played the Rymans, the couple riding their bicycles in the episode's cold open. Seehorn wanted the sprinkler they ride past to sound like a machine gun, and worked with sound mixer Phil Palmer and boom operator Mitch Gebhard to accomplish the effect. The song in the sequence, "Best Things in Life" by The Dreamliners, was selected early on in the production by music supervisor Thomas Golubić to highlight the developing contrast between the scene's beginning and end. As Seehorn put it, "I wanted everything that was idyllic in the beginning to be awful and violent in the end." The crew said the opening sequence was included because they trusted viewers to notice and remember information through visuals instead of exposition.

The reveal of the tunnel system underneath Gus's house took weeks of preparation to film. The interior and exterior of the ground floors of both houses, including the bedroom and closet in Gus's house, were real locations, while the tunnel and the two basements were all part of a connected set constructed on a soundstage. Donachie shot the sequence to look like it was filmed in one take. Some visual effects in the episode added in during post-production by Rodeo FX included the red house from the opening sequence, and the windshield and rear-view window of the car belonging to Mike's men in the long zoom shot when Kim confronts them.

The episode also features the first interaction between Kim and Mike, who is played by Jonathan Banks. It was the only scene that was not rehearsed beforehand and was inspired by Heat (1995), specifically by the first interaction between Robert De Niro's Neil McCauley and Amy Brenneman's Eady. Cherkis's script called for the scene to take place outside the diner but it was Seehorn's decision to change the setting. Some ideas for the scene would have seen Mike standing at a bus stop or sitting on a bench but these concepts were scrapped due to logistical issues, such as the amount of natural light, limited coverage of the actors, and the fact that the exterior of the diner had already been shown in "Wine and Roses". Seehorn told Banks she wanted to honor the moment by making him walk out of the diner when there was a lot of sunlight so he could "be backlit like the icon you are!" During post-production, editing for the episode was completed by Chris McCaleb in Albuquerque with the assistance of Seehorn, who was in Los Angeles. They worked remotely using FaceTime to communicate and the ClearView system to edit.

== Reception ==
=== Critical response ===
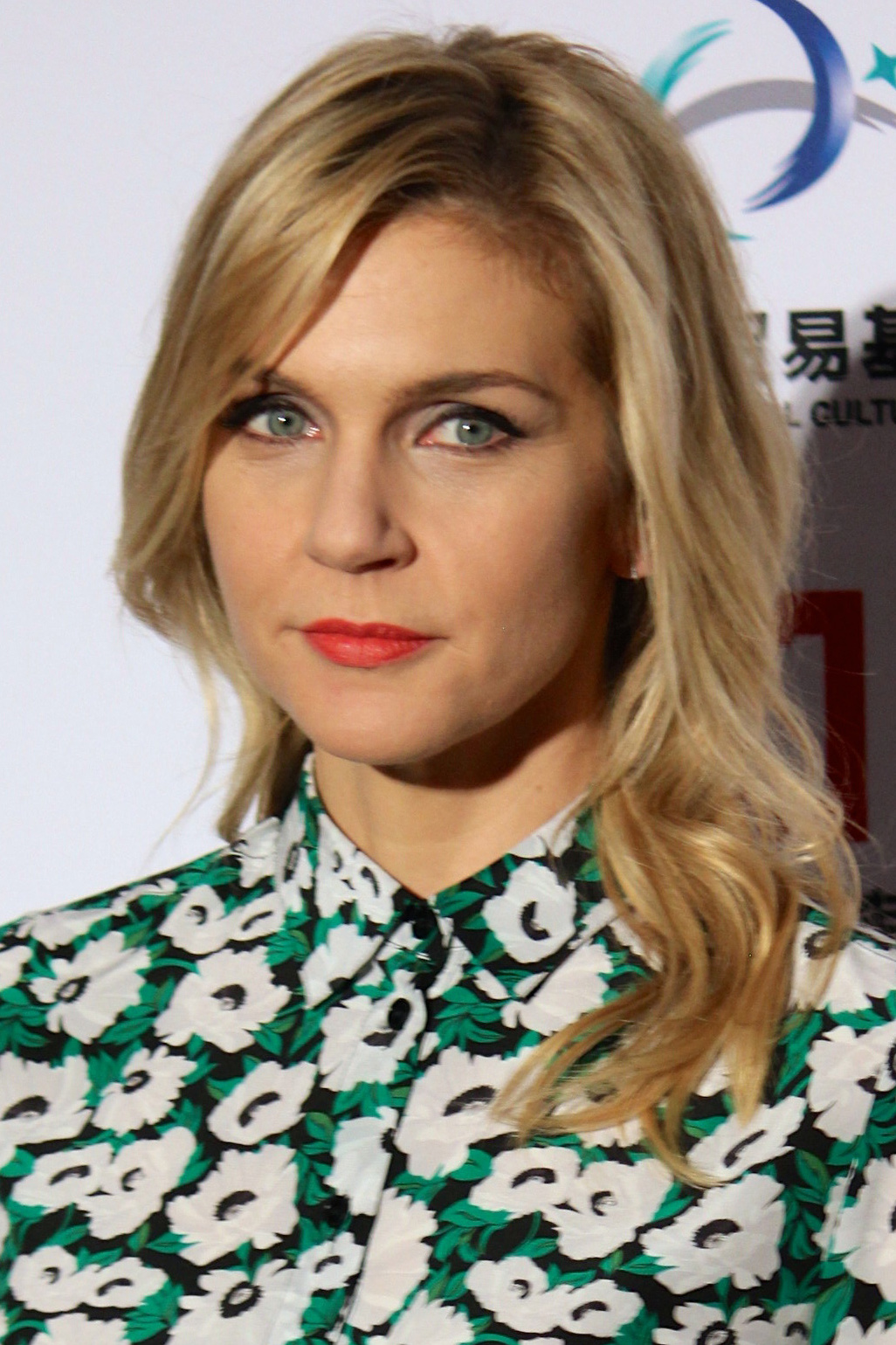
Rhea Seehorn's direction and performance in the episode received praise.

On the review aggregator website Rotten Tomatoes, 100% of seven reviews are positive, with an average rating of 9.0/10. Critics were positive of Seehorn's direction and performance, the episode's pacing, and the return of Wendy's character. Michael Hogan of Vanity Fair complimented the makeup design. Scott Tobias, writing for Vulture, called the cold open a "fun tease" for its use of the 1965 song "Best Things in Life" by the Dreamliners. He also noted the episode as "the fork in the road where Jimmy and Kim's paths diverge." Rolling Stone's Alan Sepinwall highlighted Kim and Mike's first interaction as a scene that was both "wracked with tension ... and yet also understated and lovely in the way you would hope for these two when they finally got to speak". He also praised Jimmy's steady transformation into Saul Goodman as well as Seehorn's direction, writing that "tonally and visually, this one felt and looked very much like an episode helmed by a Saul vet, rather than by someone whose only previous directorial credit on IMDb is a short film called How Not to Buy a Couch." Steve Greene from IndieWire said the actress played Kim's "internal calculus unsurprisingly well." The A.V. Club's Kimberly Potts gave positive notes to the cinematography and Seehorn's work on the episode, calling it a "stellar directorial debut in a Kim Wexler-intensive episode".

=== Ratings and accolades ===
An estimated 1.16 million viewers watched "Hit and Run" during its first broadcast on AMC on May 2, 2022. At the 74th Primetime Emmy Awards, Rhea Seehorn received her first Primetime Emmy Award nomination for Outstanding Supporting Actress in a Drama Series for this episode.
