= Mijo (Better Call Saul) =

- Better Call Saul episode
- Jimmy McGill (Bob Odenkirk) is interrogated in the desert by Nacho Varga (Michael Mando).
- Episode no.: Season 1 Episode 2
- Directed by: Michelle MacLaren
- Written by: Peter Gould
- Original air date: February 9, 2015
- Running time: 46 minutes

Guest appearances
- Raymond Cruz as Tuco Salamanca; Míriam Colón as Abuelita Salamanca; Eileen Fogarty as Mrs. Nguyen; Jamie Luner as Nancy; Daniel Spenser Levine as Cal Lindholm; Steven Levine as Lars Lindholm; Jesus Payan as Gonzo; Cesar Garcia as No-Doze; Peter Diseth as DDA Bill Oakley

Episode chronology
← Previous "Uno"	Next → "Nacho"
- Better Call Saul season 1

"Mijo" is the second episode of the first season of the American television drama series Better Call Saul, the spinoff series of Breaking Bad. Written by series co-creator Peter Gould and directed by Michelle MacLaren, "Mijo" aired on AMC in the United States on February 9, 2015, and lasted 44 minutes and 20 seconds, one night after the series premiere. Outside of the United States, the episode premiered on streaming service Netflix in several countries.

The episode marks the first appearance of Nacho Varga (played by Michael Mando). In the episode, Jimmy McGill (Bob Odenkirk) accidentally meets Tuco Salamanca (Raymond Cruz), who thinks Jimmy and his clients, twins Lars and Cal Lindholm (Daniel Levine and Steven Levine), have come to scam his grandmother (Míriam Colón). In actuality, they were attempting to scam Betsy Kettleman, the wife of the Bernalillo County Treasurer. Tuco takes Lars, Cal, and Jimmy to a remote location in the desert, where he and Nacho interrogate them.

== Plot ==
Tuco Salamanca is preparing salsa when his grandmother returns after her run-in with the Lindholm brothers. Though they accidentally targeted the wrong driver, Cal and Lars follow her home and falsely claim serious injuries from the staged accident. They demand money, so Tuco uses her cane to beat them unconscious, then arranges for Nacho Varga, No-Doze, and Gonzo to come with a van. Jimmy McGill arrives at the front door searching for Cal and Lars, and Tuco drags him inside at gunpoint.

Jimmy insists the twins did not intentionally target Tuco's grandmother. Tuco allows Jimmy to see Cal and Lars, who are bound and gagged, but when Jimmy removes Lars' gag, he immediately implicates Jimmy.

Tuco and his men take Jimmy, Cal, and Lars to the desert and question Jimmy. He tells Tuco he is a lawyer, but when Tuco does not believe him and threatens to cut off a finger, Jimmy falsely claims he is an FBI agent. Nacho is suspicious and threatens Jimmy again, so Jimmy goes back to admitting the truth — he is a lawyer who intended to scam the Kettlemans.

Nacho convinces Tuco that killing a lawyer would attract unwanted attention. Tuco frees Jimmy but moves to kill Cal and Lars. Jimmy convinces Tuco to spare their lives and talks him into only breaking one leg each as punishment.

After bringing the twins to a hospital, Jimmy arrives at a bar for a date. A customer's snapping breadsticks remind Jimmy of the broken legs, so he excuses himself and vomits in the bathroom. An intoxicated Jimmy later collapses on Chuck McGill's couch after forgetting to leave his cellular phone in Chuck's mailbox. Chuck's EHS causes him to throw the phone outside. The following morning, Chuck admits to seeing the hospital bill for Cal and Lars; Jimmy reassures Chuck that he is not returning to his conman past.

Jimmy returns to his office after several days in court, where the salon owner, Mrs. Nguyen, tells him a client has arrived. The client is Nacho, who tells Jimmy he wants to steal the Kettlemans' $1.6 million of embezzled funds, for which he will pay Jimmy a finder's fee. Jimmy insists he is a lawyer, not a criminal. Nacho writes his phone number on one of Jimmy's matchbooks and tells Jimmy to call when he figures out he is "in the game".

== Production ==
The episode was written by series co-creator and executive producer Peter Gould, who originally wrote the episode that introduced Saul Goodman in the second season of Breaking Bad. It was directed by Michelle MacLaren, the most prolific director for Breaking Bad, directing 11 episodes and also served as an executive producer.

During the episode, there is a montage in which Jimmy's routine is revealed: grabbing his coffee, defending clients, collecting his check, and his ongoing battle with the parking attendant, Mike. During his routine, he always looks in the mirror as he states, "It's showtime, folks!"—a line from Bob Fosse's All That Jazz. All That Jazz is about a director and choreographer trying to balance his work and personal life. The use of the line "It's showtime, folks!" emphasizes the concept that Jimmy views this as a performance.

== Reception ==
Upon moving to its regular Monday slot, the episode received 3.4 million viewers and a 1.6 rating among adults 18–49 in the United States. This equated to a 50 percent drop in viewers, along with a 52 percent decline in the demographic.

Erik Kain of Forbes said that despite hating the long and drawn-out restaurant scene, the overall episode was good. Despite this he felt that he wasn't "sitting nearly as close to the edge of my seat [as in Breaking Bad]—but it's entertaining and funny and still beautifully shot, acted, and written". David Segal of The New York Times, in a positive review, noted that his favorite part of the episode "is the elaborate, jaunty montage of Jimmy at court, which pays tribute to the elaborate, jaunty montage in Bob Fosse's All That Jazz, complete with the same Vivaldi concerto and 'It's showtime!' catchphrase".

Catherine Gee of The Daily Telegraph gave the episode 4 out of 5 stars, saying:

We got to see Jimmy McGill... truly show off his negotiating skills when haggling over the twins' fate. And it is in the deft hands of the episode’s writer and co-creator Peter Gould that we got to indulge in a light chuckle over whether McGill can talk Tuco down from a flaying to a leg-breaking while avoiding the possible detours of eye-gouging and tongue-ripping.

Roth Cornet of IGN gave the episode a 9 out of 10, saying "Better Call Saul hit the ground running with its second episode; setting the stage for a series that is part morality play, part Greek tragedy (replete with a foregone and less than savory conclusion) and part love letter to great performers—whatever walk of life they happen to be on." Richard Vine of The Guardian was also positive in his view. In particular, he felt that "the best thing to come out of the desert is our introduction to Nacho Varga. Tuco's far more reasonable associate has sized up the situation and tracked Jimmy down to his 'office'".

Writing for The Atlantic, Spencer Kornhaber named "Mijo" one of the best television episodes of 2015.
