= Nacho Varga =

Fictional character in the television series Better Call Saul

- Better Call Saul character
- Michael Mando as Nacho Varga in a promotional poster for Better Call Saul's fifth season
- First appearance: "Mijo"; February 9, 2015
- Last appearance: "Rock and Hard Place"; April 25, 2022
- Created by: Vince Gilligan; Peter Gould
- Portrayed by: Michael Mando

In-universe information
- Full name: Ignacio Varga
- Occupation: Drug cartel member
- Family: Manuel Varga (father)
- Significant others: Amber; Jo; Nikki
- Home: Albuquerque, New Mexico, United States
- Nationality: Mexican American

Ignacio "Nacho" Varga (Spanish pronunciation: [iɡˌnasjo ˌnat͡ʃo ˈbaɾɡa]) is a fictional character who appears as one of the main protagonists in the AMC television series Better Call Saul, a prequel spin-off of Breaking Bad. He is portrayed by Michael Mando and was created by Vince Gilligan and Peter Gould.

Dialogue that introduces Saul Goodman in the Breaking Bad episode "Better Call Saul" mentions Nacho and Lalo Salamanca, though neither appears in Breaking Bad. Nacho is a quiet and intelligent member of the Salamanca drug organization with a strong desire to leave, though his fear of the Salamancas and later Gus Fring stops him. He cares deeply for the well-being of his honest, hard-working father, Manuel. He gets associated with Jimmy McGill after Jimmy helps clear him of kidnapping charges. When the Salamancas seek to use his father's shop as a front for the drug ring, Nacho attempts to kill Hector Salamanca—the family patriarch—by switching his heart medication for a placebo. This is discovered by Gus Fring, who runs the rival drug trade. Nacho is forced to be a mole for Gus within the Salamancas' organization, which is further complicated when the shrewd Lalo arrives to oversee operations.

== Concept and development ==
The Canadian actor Michael Mando said that he had been approached through his agent from Better Call Saul's casting directors about being in the show. After sending in an audition tape, he was flown to Los Angeles to meet with showrunners Vince Gilligan and Peter Gould and perform a screen test. Mando said it was "love at first sight" working with the pair because of how well they provided direction and feedback. He was notified about getting the part a few weeks later. Breaking Bad season two episode "Better Call Saul" mentions the character by his real name, Ignacio. This episode also introduces Saul Goodman (Jimmy McGill's business name) and mentions Lalo.

To prepare for playing Nacho, Mando watched crime and criminology documentaries to understand the motivations of criminals; and watched all of Breaking Bad. Mando considered Nacho to be "extremely intelligent and patient", and a character that would grow over the course of the show. He said that the showrunners gave little direction, and instead "They wanted to see what I would bring to the character"; allowing him to develop Nacho himself. He explored elements of Mayan and Aztec cultures to bring to the character and also incorporated some superficial traits from his Orphan Black character Vic Schmidt.

Mando said that initially, Nacho was going to have a larger role with Jimmy in the first season - as the "Big Bad" - but as Gilligan and Gould wrote out the season, they made the character of Chuck McGill more of an antagonist for Jimmy; and so Nacho was placed on a slower path to be developed in later seasons. Mando said that he felt that this helped fit Nacho's character; waiting patiently for the right opportunity to make a move to get ahead. Mando considered Nacho the only character in Better Call Saul that was "breaking good", as "an ambitious person who believes in a morality outside of justice" and trying to improve his situation, making him "heroic, romantic, and transcendent". Gould wanted to bring Mando back for the series finale alongside other Better Call Saul actors but, wanting to avoid an "overstuffed epic", he and the writing staff were unable to incorporate all of the characters that they wanted to present in the finale.

== Character biography ==
=== Background ===
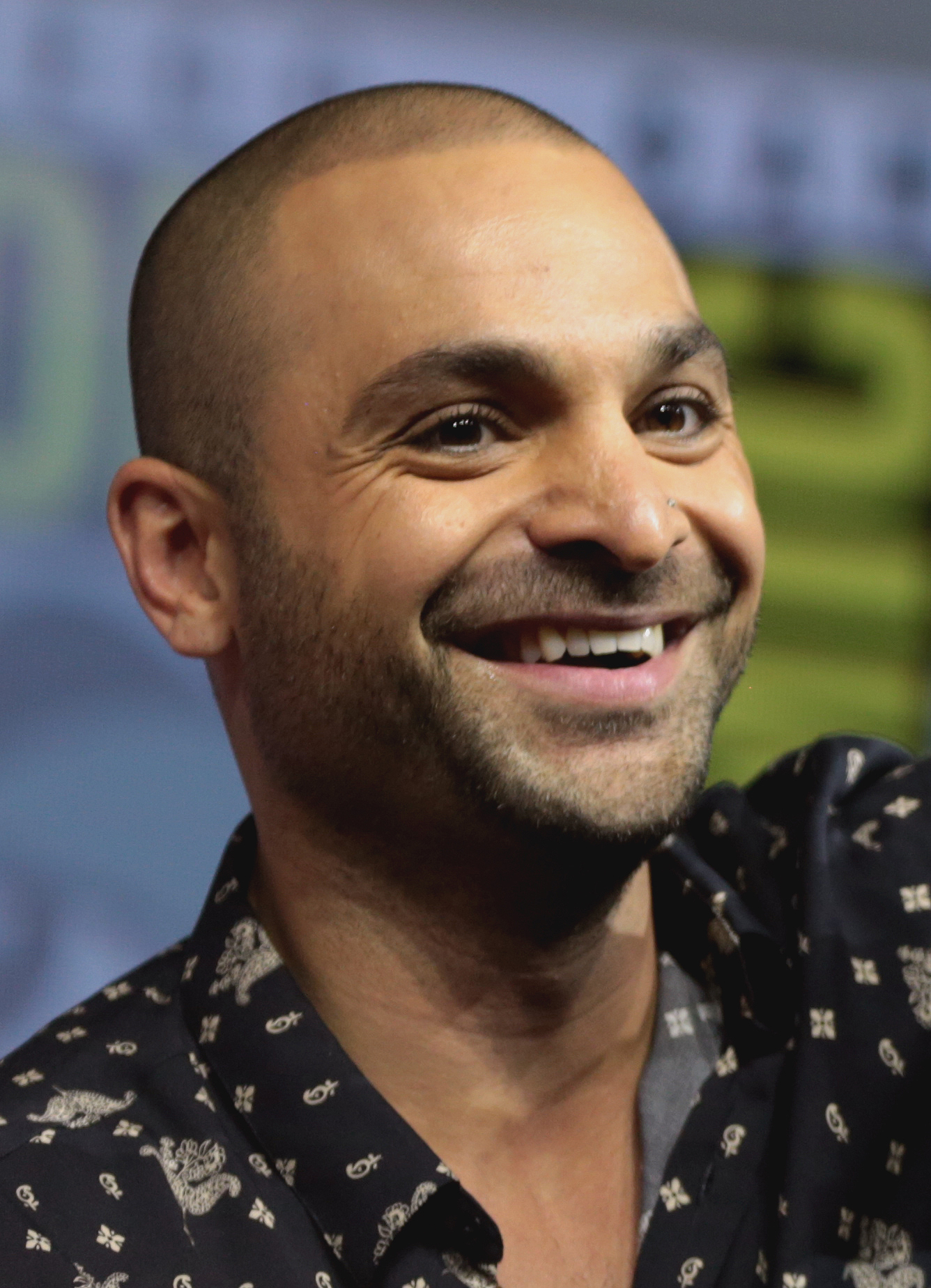
Michael Mando portrays Nacho Varga in Better Call Saul.

Prior to Better Call Saul, Nacho is one of the lieutenants in the Salamanca drug trade under Tuco Salamanca in Albuquerque, New Mexico. When he has time, he helps his father Manuel at an upholstery-repair shop.

Around 1996 and 1997, Nacho and Tuco were working with a biker gang from Riverside County, California. They distributed low-quality methamphetamine, though Tuco grew to like it. Nacho witnessed an intoxicated Tuco shoot and kill one of his dealers, Dog Paulson, whom he suspected of supplying his competitors. A piece of Dog's skull became lodged in Nacho's shoulder. The incident led Nacho to grow increasingly wary of Tuco's erratic behavior, which was worsened by his drug use.

=== Better Call Saul ===
==== Season 1 ====
While attempting to represent Craig Kettleman, a county treasurer accused of embezzling $1.6 million in tax money, Jimmy McGill has a run-in with Tuco, who has Nacho and other associates drag Jimmy and two skaters involved with Jimmy's scheme to the desert to kill them. Nacho believes Jimmy's plea that he is a lawyer and convinces Tuco that killing an attorney would result in police scrutiny of the Salamanca family's drug business, so Tuco lets Jimmy go. Nacho later approaches Jimmy about stealing the money from Craig and his wife Betsy, asking where in the Kettleman's residence the money is stored, but Jimmy refuses. Jimmy anonymously warns the Kettlemans, who then disappear from their home. Nacho, who was spotted watching the Kettleman's home at night in preparation for the burglary, is the prime suspect and is arrested. He coerces Jimmy into helping clear his name and Jimmy locates the Kettlemans, which leads to Nacho's release.

Nacho engages in a side deal with "Pryce", who wants to sell pills stolen from the pharmaceutical company where he works. Pryce brings Mike Ehrmantraut as a bodyguard. When Nacho's payment is $20 short, Mike insists he pay the full amount. As Pryce and Mike leave, Mike explains that he knew Nacho was conducting the transaction without the Salamancas' knowledge and so had an incentive to make sure the deal went smoothly.

==== Season 2 ====
Pryce uses his drug money to buy a flashy Hummer. Seeing the flashy car as a risk of compromise, Mike refuses to participate in the next deal, so Pryce goes alone. With no bodyguard to keep a watch on Pryce's interest, Nacho takes the opportunity to learn his real name — Daniel Wormald — and address. He later breaks into Daniel's house and steals the money back, along with a valuable collection of baseball cards. Daniel reports the collection's theft to the police, who discover an empty hiding place. Mike realizes his involvement will be uncovered if the police continue to investigate, so he convinces Nacho to give Daniel the cards and $10,000 in exchange for the Hummer.

Nacho is impressed by Mike's coolness under pressure. As Tuco becomes increasingly volatile and the likelihood of his learning about Nacho's secret deals increases, Nacho decides to eliminate Tuco and tries to hire Mike to kill him, but Mike instead arranges for Tuco to attack him in view of police, leading to Tuco's arrest and conviction. Hector Salamanca has Nacho take Tuco's place in the organization. After Hector attempts to coerce Mike into giving false testimony to the police by threatening his daughter-in-law and granddaughter, Mike agrees to say the gun Tuco was carrying when he assaulted Mike was not Tuco's, which will result in a shorter sentence for Tuco. Mike then attempts to draw police attention to the Salamanca operation by hijacking one of the trucks used to smuggle drugs over the Mexican border, leaving the driver tied up, gagged and alive at the side of the road and stealing the US$250,000 hidden in one of the tires. Nacho tells Mike that Hector covered up the hijacking by killing the Good Samaritan who stopped to aid the driver.

==== Season 3 ====
Mike's actions lead to Hector looking for other routes to smuggle drugs, and he considers using Nacho's father Manuel's upholstery shop. Nacho objects but fails to change Hector's mind. In pleading with his father, Nacho reveals his involvement in the Salamanca organization. Manuel accepts Hector's initial payment after Nacho convinces him that doing so is for his own safety. Nacho realizes Hector suffers from angina and decides to try to kill him by replacing his nitroglycerin with ibuprofen in the hopes of inducing a fatal heart-attack. Mike advises Nacho that if Hector dies, Nacho should immediately take the ibuprofen capsules from Hector and replace them with the real ones so that the cause of Hector's death will not be uncovered.

Nacho succeeds in making the switch, but Hector does not die; so Nacho plans to shoot him. Before he can act, Nacho is notified to attend a meeting with Gus Fring, Juan Bolsa, and Hector. Juan informs Hector that Juárez Cartel leader Don Eladio Vuente has decreed that the cartel will make the transport of Hector's drugs via Gus's trucks a permanent arrangement. An outraged Hector has a stroke and falls to the ground unconscious. Gus performs first aid while awaiting an ambulance, and succeeds in saving Hector's life, though he remains comatose. Nacho takes the ibuprofen capsules from Hector and replaces them with the real medication. Gus looks at Nacho suspiciously.

==== Season 4 ====
Juan tells Nacho that he and Arturo Colon will run the Salamanca family while Hector is hospitalized. Gus pays for Hector's specialized care and, while reviewing Hector's medical records, realizes there is no nitroglycerin in his system, which means Nacho tried to kill him. When Nacho and Arturo arrive at Gus's chicken farm to pick up their next cocaine shipment, Gus ambushes Arturo and suffocates him with a plastic bag. Gus reveals that he is aware of Nacho's attempt to kill Hector, but has not told the Salamancas, so Nacho is now under his control. Nacho, Victor, and Tyrus Kitt fake an ambush site on a remote road, which includes riddling Nacho's car with bullets, shooting Arturo's body, and wounding Nacho. Nacho succeeds in calling Leonel and Marco Salamanca (the Cousins) for help. They burn the car and take him to veterinarian Dr. Caldera, who succeeds in saving Nacho's life.

Victor sells the drugs taken from Nacho to the Espinosas, a rival gang. Nacho falsely identifies the Espinosas to Leonel and Marco as the ones who attacked him. They attack the Espinosa compound, kill everyone inside, and recover the "stolen" drugs. Nacho sees that by wiping out the Espinosas, Gus has secured more drug territory for himself, but does not yet see the full scope of Gus's plan. Nacho goes to his father's house to recover, and Manuel takes him in despite being unhappy about Nacho's continuing association with the Salamancas. After recovering, Nacho takes on a more prominent role in the Salamanca organization and keeps a safe with cash and fake Canadian IDs for himself and his father. Nacho is surprised when Lalo Salamanca arrives to aid in running the business, and takes a stronger interest in the day-to-day details than Hector did.

==== Season 5 ====
Gus threatens harm to Manuel to coerce Nacho into providing inside information on the Salamancas. Nacho tries to convince Manuel to move away, but Manuel refuses to leave. When one of the Salamanca drug houses is discovered by police and Domingo Molina is arrested, Nacho sneaks over rooftops to recover the drug stash before police enter, which impresses Lalo, who begins to take Nacho into his confidence. Nacho then brings Jimmy to Lalo so they can arrange to have Domingo released before he talks to police. Jimmy secures Domingo's release and assures his protection by making him a confidential informant for DEA agent Hank Schrader and having him reveal the location of Gus's dead drops. Lalo is pleased by their work, though Nacho warns Jimmy that once he begins working for drug dealers like the Salamancas, there is no turning back.

Nacho reports Lalo's plan for Gus's dead drops to Gus, who unhappily accepts the loss of nearly $1 million to keep secret Nacho's identity as a mole within the Salamanca organization. Unaware that Nacho knows Mike, Gus directs Nacho to report to him. Nacho tries to warn Mike about Gus's ruthlessness, but Mike reminds Nacho that he warned Nacho about the risk he was taking when he tried to kill Hector. (Note: As seen in "Expenses".) With Nacho's assistance, Mike poses as a private detective to feed the police information that ties Lalo to the murder of Fred Whalen, a money wire store clerk. (Note: As seen in "Winner".) Lalo is arrested and held without bail, but he contacts Nacho and orders him to continue harassing Gus by destroying one of Gus's restaurants, which Nacho reports to Mike. Mike alerts Gus, who works with Nacho to destroy the restaurant, again keeping secret Nacho's role as Gus's mole.

Mike tells Gus that Nacho wants to end his role as a mole, but Gus refuses to give up a valuable asset. After obtaining bail, Lalo plans to return to Mexico, and Nacho drives him there. Nacho and Lalo arrive at Lalo's fortified hacienda in Chihuahua, which Mike reports to Gus. Gus says he has sent gunmen to kill Lalo and that Nacho may be able to help. Lalo introduces Nacho to his family and friends, and Nacho receives a call instructing him to leave Lalo's back gate open at 3 am. Lalo takes him to meet Eladio, who blesses Lalo and Nacho's plan for Nacho to run the Salamanca drug business in Lalo's absence. Lalo is awake at the appointed hour, so Nacho sets a kitchen fire as a distraction. When Lalo goes to investigate, Nacho opens the back gate and flees, while the gunmen kill Lalo's guards and most of his family. Lalo kills all but one gunman and forces the survivor to falsely report the mission a success, then realizes that Nacho is missing.

==== Season 6 ====
Nacho flees Lalo's compound and takes refuge at a motel arranged for by Gus. He calls Tyrus, who tells him to hide until it is safe to move. Nacho then attempts to reach Mike, who declines to take the call. Juan informs Gus that the cartel has placed a bounty on Nacho. Gus's men break into Nacho's safe, and Mike removes the cash and Nacho and Manuel's fake Canadian IDs. Victor delivers a duplicate safe, into which Mike places the cash, Nacho's fake ID, and an envelope. Juan finds the envelope, which contains the motel's phone number and details of an offshore bank account. Nacho realizes he is being surveilled, meaning Gus has betrayed him to the cartel. The Cousins search the motel but Nacho escapes. Mike has a standoff with Gus and Tyrus because Mike wants to lead a team to find Nacho but Gus wants to force Nacho to reveal himself by taking Manuel hostage.

Nacho evades the pursuing Salamancas and cleans himself at a mechanic's shop. He places a farewell call to Manuel, then contacts Mike with an offer to surrender to Gus in exchange for assurances that Manuel will not be harmed. Nacho is secretly transported back to the United States, where Mike beats him up to make it appear Nacho was captured. Gus instructs Nacho to claim that the hit on Lalo was organized by a rival gang, the Alvarezes. Gus, Tyrus, and Victor hand Nacho over to Juan, Hector, and the Cousins as Mike watches and trains his rifle on them. As planned, Nacho falsely claims that Gus had no involvement in the attack on Lalo and reveals that he tried to kill Hector by switching his nitroglycerin for sugar pills, (Note: As seen in "Slip".) but that Gus saved him. (Note: As seen in "Lantern".) Rather than pretend to flee as planned so that he can avoid torture by the Salamancas by having Victor kill him quickly, Nacho uses a piece of broken glass to free himself from his zip tie, seizes Juan's gun, and shoots himself in the head. The Cousins then assist Hector to fire bullets into Nacho's lifeless body.

Lalo later confronts Jimmy and Kim Wexler in their apartment, ties Jimmy up, and mentions Nacho's betrayal, asking Jimmy if he had any involvement in the attack. Jimmy denies this and blames Nacho completely before Lalo gags him and promises to return to continue the interrogation, but Lalo is killed by Gus before he can return. Afterwards, Mike informs Manuel of Nacho's fate. Mike promises justice for Nacho but Manuel rejects any more bloodshed, saying Mike is no better than those responsible for his son's death, and walks away from him.

=== Breaking Bad ===
==== Season 2 ====
Though Nacho never appears in Breaking Bad, Saul mentions him when Walter White and Jesse Pinkman kidnap and hold Saul at gunpoint to coerce him into representing Badger, who has been arrested for selling drugs. Believing Walt and Jesse were sent by Lalo, he says in a panic, "It wasn't me, it was Ignacio! He's the one! ... Lalo didn't sent you? No Lalo?" but is relieved when Walt and Jesse's confusion confirms they have no connection to Nacho and Lalo. (Note: This scene, including Saul's fear of Lalo and Ignacio, is revisited in the sixth season Better Call Saul episode "Breaking Bad".)

== Reception ==
The character of Nacho Varga and Michael Mando's portrayal garnered critical acclaim. Kenny Herzog of Vulture praised Nacho as the "most compelling criminal" of the series, describing how Mando "plays the character with a mix of humanity and hubris that's rare among TV henchmen." Praising Mando's fifth-season performance, David Segal of The New York Times wrote "[Nacho's] torment is all cinched down, everything roiling behind his eyes. [Mando] manages to convey Nacho's heartbreaking predicament without raising his voice, or asking for pity."

Mando's performance in the episode "Rock and Hard Place" was highly praised. Alan Sepinwall of Rolling Stone complimented the episode's straightforward narrative and said Mando's performance was "fantastic throughout — so tired, so defeated, and yet so insistent about ending things on something resembling his own terms if he can. It is a tour de force, particularly the phone call sequence and Nacho staring down the Salamancas for the last time." TVLine named Mando the performer of the week of April 30, 2022. They called it "a beautifully moving episode that saw Mando hit new dramatic heights ... we could see the emotions welling up in Mando's eyes as his character's tragic fate began to settle in. ... Nacho may not have lived long enough to share the screen with Breaking Bad's Walt and Jesse — but with Mando's truly exceptional performance this week, he's more than earned the right to share the screen with anyone."

Together with other regular cast members, Mando was nominated for his performance as Nacho at the Screen Actors Guild Award for Outstanding Performance by an Ensemble in a Drama Series for 2018 and 2020.
