= Daniel and Luis Moncada =

Honduran-American actors (born 1980 and 1977)

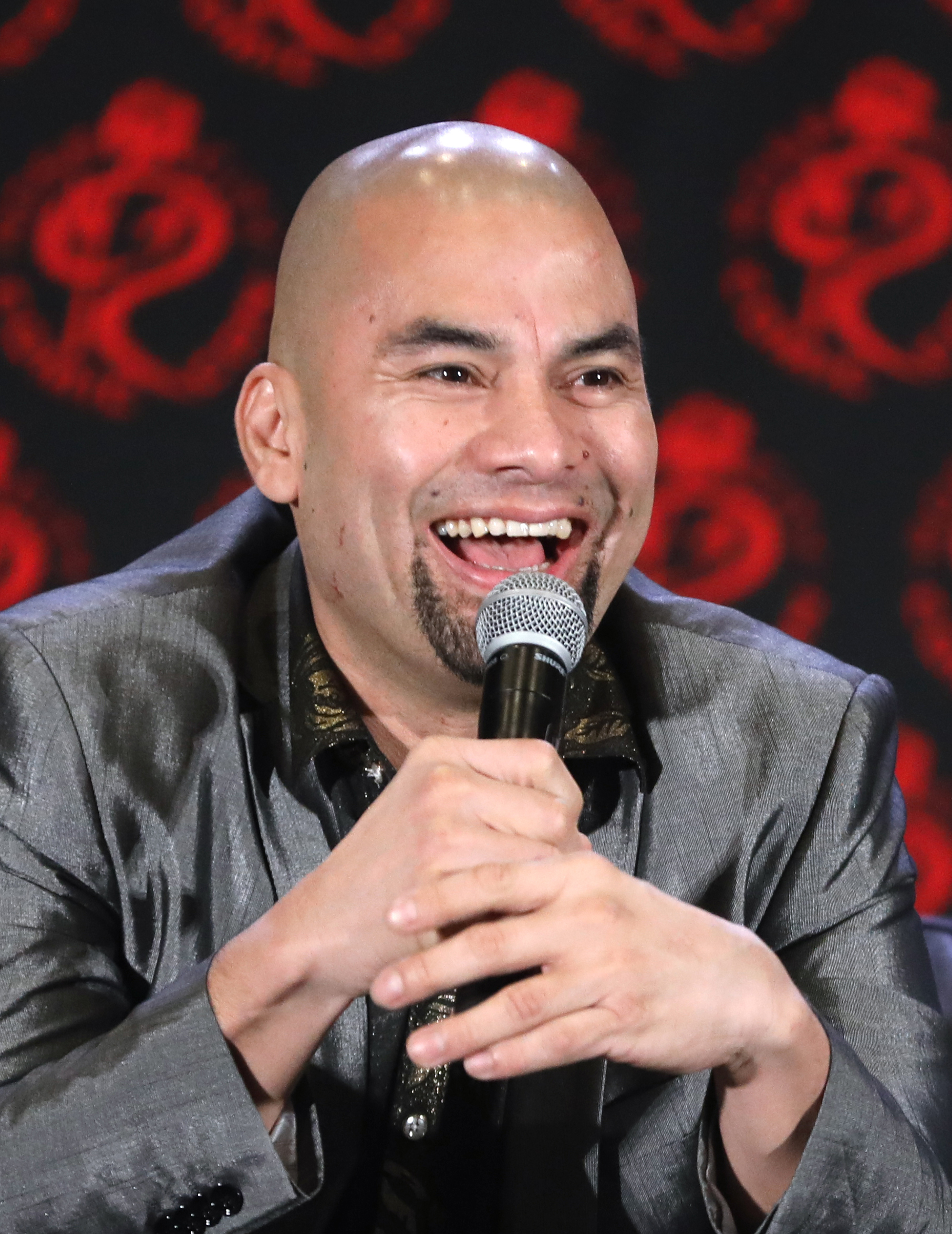
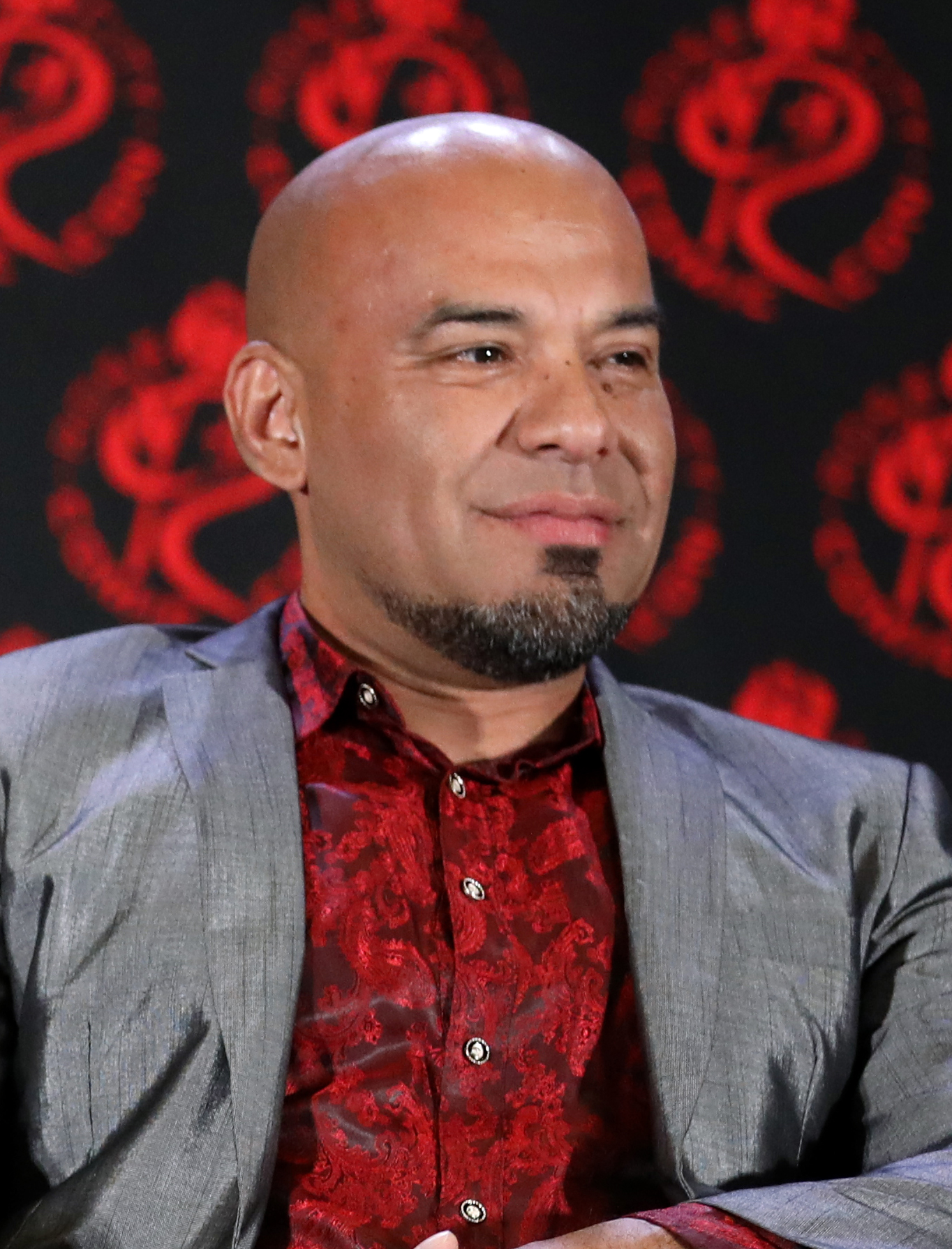
- Daniel and Luis Mocanda in 2024
- Born: Daniel Moncada; May 17, 1980 (age 46) Luis Moncada; July 18, 1977 (age 49); Honduras
- Occupation: Actors

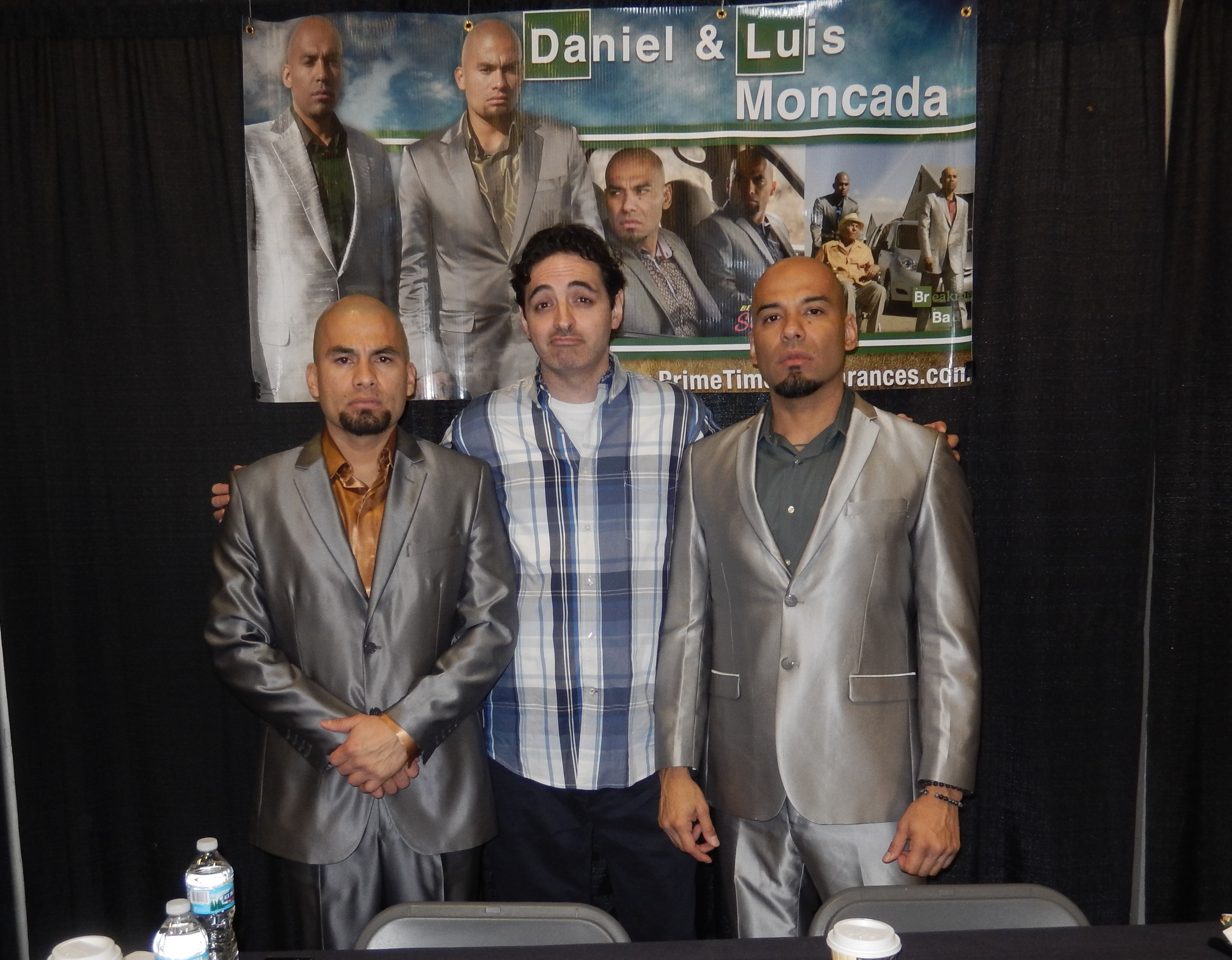
Daniel and Luis in 2019

Daniel Moncada (born 17 May 1980) and Luis Moncada (born 18 July 1977) are Honduran actors and brothers best known for their role as "The Cousins" Leonel and Marco Salamanca on the AMC crime drama series Breaking Bad (2008–2013) and its spin-off Better Call Saul (2015–2022). Despite playing twins on television, Luis is the elder brother by three years.

Luis Moncada was formerly in a gang and served a prison sentence for vehicle theft.

As of 2025, they are both partnered streamers on Twitch.

== Filmography ==
=== Daniel's roles ===
- Breaking Bad (2010) and Better Call Saul (2016–2022) – Leonel Salamanca
- Justified (2014) – Manolo
- Sabotage (2014) – Brujo's Sicario #5
- McFarland, USA (2015) – Eddie
- Blood Father (2016) – Choop
- Bright (2017) – Shadow (uncredited)
- The Mule (2018) – Eduardo
- Dead End (2019) – Little Sleepy

=== Luis' roles ===
- Latin Dragon (2004) – Gangster
- Collateral (2004) – Cold Eyed Killer
- El Padrino (2004) – Bodyguard (uncredited)
- Yard Sale (2004) – Gang Member #2
- Hitting the Bricks (2008) – Rudy
- Days of Wrath (2008) – Oso
- Fast & Furious (2009) – Scar Thug
- Down for Life (2009) – Oso
- Deep in Death (2009) - Jesus
- Breaking Bad (2010) and Better Call Saul (2016–2022) – Marco Salamanca
- Dexter (2011) – Julio Benes
- K-11 (2012) – ShyBoy
- Sabotage (2014) – Brujo's Sicario #2
- Brooklyn Nine-Nine (2014) – Tito Ruiz
- Street Level (2015) – Tommy
- So B. It (2016) – Zander's Dad
- This Is Now (2016) – Johnny
- The Night Is Young (2017) – Luis
- Bright (2017) – Casper
- Get Shorty (2019) – Queso
