= Michael Mando =

Canadian actor (born 1981)

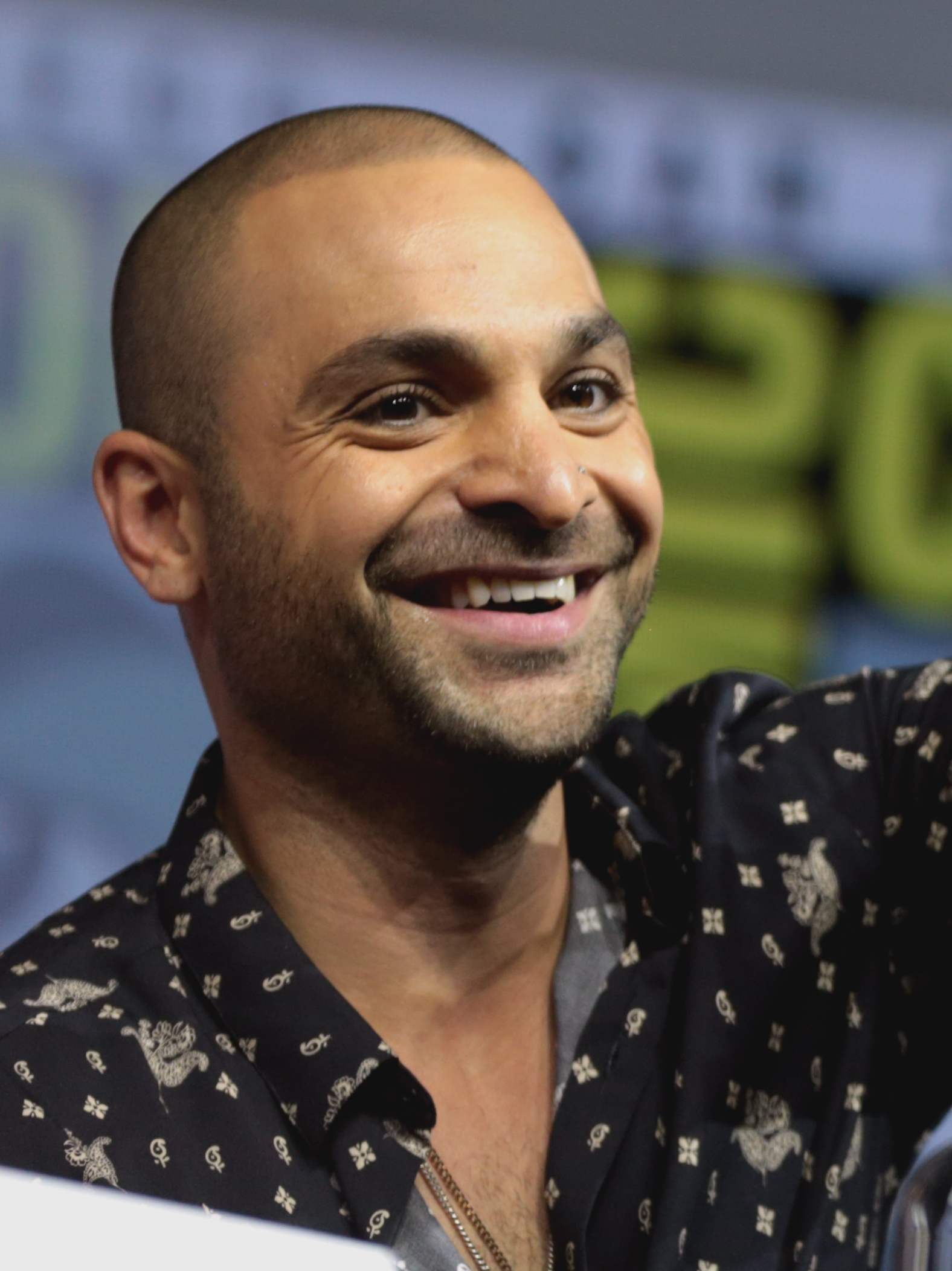
- Mando in 2018
- Born: Mikel Mroué; July 13, 1981 (age 45); Quebec City, Quebec, Canada
- Occupation: Actor
- Years active: 2008–present

Mikel Mroué (born July 13, 1981), better known as Michael Mando, is a Canadian actor. He played Nacho Varga on the AMC series Better Call Saul (2015–2022), Vaas Montenegro in the video game franchise Far Cry (2012, 2021), Vic Schmidt in the sci-fi series Orphan Black (2013–2014), and Mac Gargan / Scorpion in the Marvel Cinematic Universe films Spider-Man: Homecoming (2017) and Spider-Man: Brand New Day (2026). He is a two-time Canadian Screen Award and Screen Actors Guild Award nominee.

== Early life and education ==
Mando was born in Quebec City, Quebec, on July 13, 1981. He was raised by his father and is the second of three brothers. The family moved around a lot, living in more than 35 homes in 10 cities across four continents before he was in his mid-20s. His native language is French, and he is also fluent in English and Arabic. He grew up wanting to be a writer or an athlete.

In his mid-20s, he suffered a knee injury and consequently decided to change paths. He was enrolled in many fields, including international relations at the University of Montreal before discovering the performing arts at the Dome Theatre Program at Dawson College in 2004. He went on to play the male lead in all five productions of the program. He graduated in 2007. His Dome credits include Orlando in Shakespeare's As You Like It, Professor Katz in David Edgar's Pentecost, and Valentine Xavier in Tennessee Williams' Orpheus Descending. Steven W. Lecky, the chair of the program, called Mando "one of the finest talents to emerge from the program in the past 25 years".

== Career ==
After playing the leading character in two award-winning professional theatre productions in Montreal, Mando founded Red Barlo Productions. The company's first film, Conditional Affection (which Mando starred in, directed and wrote) was released in 2010 and officially selected to Fantasia, Bare Bones, ACTRA Short Films, and the New Hope International Film Festivals.

Mando's television debut followed shortly after, and he played a wide range of contrasting characters. His credits include guest appearances in the crime series The Bridge, the medical drama mini-series Bloodletting and Miraculous Cures, as an MS-13 gang member in The Border, and as a close friend of the character Kenzi (played by Ksenia Solo) in the fantasy series Lost Girl.

Mando has often collaborated with directors John Fawcett and Érik Canuel as well as producer David Barlow. He had a starring role in the 2010 feature film Territories. In 2011, he had a recurring role in Les Bleus de Ramville and a guest appearance on the series King.

He is the voice and likeness of Vaas Montenegro, a major antagonist of the 2012 video game Far Cry 3. His performance was nominated for several video game awards in 2014, winning Best New Character at The 4th Canadian Videogame Awards. He also starred in a webseries called Far Cry: The Experience as Vaas, who captures and tortures Christopher Mintz-Plasse as himself. In the 2020s, Mando would reprise his role as Vaas for Far Cry VR: Dive Into Insanity and Far Cry 6.

In 2012, Mando was cast in the first season of the science fiction television series Orphan Black, which began airing in 2013. He played Vic Schmidt, an abusive drug-dealer, and was nominated for a Canadian Screen Award for his work on the series (having also been nominated for his guest role on Rookie Blue that same year). He reprised his role of Vic in the second season in a recurring role.

In 2014, Mando joined the cast of Better Call Saul, the Breaking Bad spin-off, portraying Nacho Varga, a career criminal. He played the character for all six seasons of the show, earning nominations for awards as part of the show's ensemble in 2019 and 2021, and later for his individual performance in the final season.

Mando played Mac Gargan in the Marvel movie Spider-Man: Homecoming in 2017. In 2023, he was set to star in the series Dope Thief, but was fired due to a physical altercation with another cast member. In 2025, it was announced that Mando would reprise his role of Mac Gargan for Spider-Man: Brand New Day.

== Filmography ==
=== Film ===
Key
| † | Denotes films that have not yet been released |

| Year | Title | Role | Notes |
|---|---|---|---|
| 2010 | Conditional Affection | Jack | Short film Also director, writer and producer |
| 2010 | Territories | Jalil Adel-Khalid | |
| 2011 | Abyss of the Mind | Johnny H. | |
| 2012 | The Good Lie | Orville | |
| 2013 | The Colony | Cooper | |
| 2013 | Elysium | Rico | Uncredited |
| 2013 | Make Your Move | Raphael | |
| 2016 | Wake Up | Johnny H. / Alter Ego | Short film Also director, writer and producer |
| 2017 | Spider-Man: Homecoming | Mac Gargan | |
| 2018 | The Hummingbird Project | Mark Vega | |
| 2024 | King Ivory | Ramón Garza | |
| 2025 | Boyfighter | Diego | Short film |
| 2026 | 72 Hours | Jaze | |
| 2026 | Spider-Man: Brand New Day | Mac Gargan / Scorpion | |
| 2026 | Batman: Knightfall | Bane | Voice |
| TBA | Gundam † | TBA | Post-production |

=== Television ===
Key
| † | Denotes television productions that have not yet been released |

| Year | Title | Role | Notes |
|---|---|---|---|
| 2008; 2010 | The Border | Mirza / Marco | 2 episodes |
| 2009 | The Last Templar | Necia First Mate | 2 episodes |
| 2009 | Web of Lies | Danny Wilcox | Television film |
| 2009 | Flashpoint | Felipe | Episode: "Eagle Two" |
| 2010 | Bloodletting and Miraculous Cures | Dr. Manolas | 2 episodes |
| 2010 | The Bridge | K9 | Episode: "Voices Carry" |
| 2010 | Lost Girl | Neville | Episode: "(Dis)Members Only" |
| 2011 | King | Esteban Demarco | Episode: "T-Bone" |
| 2011 | Michael: Tuesdays & Thursdays | Alain | Episode: "Unscripted Conversation" |
| 2012 | The Pregnancy Project | Javier Rodriguez | Television film |
| 2012 | Les Bleus de Ramville | Marc-Andre David | 8 episodes |
| 2012 | Psych | Chuy | Episode: "Let's Doo-Wop It Again" |
| 2012 | The Killing | Vasquez | Episode: "Off the Reservation" |
| 2013 | The Listener | Len Gazicki | Episode: "Buckle Up" |
| 2013 | Rookie Blue | Cesar Medina | Episode: "The Kids Are Not Alright" |
| 2013 | Covert Affairs | Eduardo | Episode: "Into the White" |
| 2013–14 | Orphan Black | Victor "Vic" Schmidt | 9 episodes |
| 2014 | La marraine | Alvaro Pessoa | 5 episodes |
| 2015–22 | Better Call Saul | Ignacio "Nacho" Varga | 33 episodes, main cast |
| 2016 | The Crossroads of History | Gaum | Episode: "Columbus" |
| 2025 | The American Revolution | Marquis de Lafayette | Ken Burns documentary series, voice role |
| 2027 | Criminal † | Jeff | Recurring role |

=== Video games ===
| Year | Title | Voice role | Notes |
|---|---|---|---|
| 2010 | Shaun White Skateboarding | Francisco Crystobal | |
| 2012 | Far Cry 3 | Vaas Montenegro | Also likeness & motion capture |
| 2021 | Far Cry 6 | Vaas Montenegro | Also likeness & motion capture |
| 2021 | Far Cry VR: Dive Into Insanity | Vaas Montenegro | Also likeness & motion capture |

=== Web ===
| Year | Title | Role | Notes |
|---|---|---|---|
| 2012 | Far Cry: The Experience | Vaas Montenegro | 4 episodes |

== Accolades ==
| Year | Award | Category | Work | Result | Ref. |
|---|---|---|---|---|---|
| 2013 | New York Videogame Critics Circle Awards | Best Overall Acting | Far Cry 3 | Nominated | |
| 2013 | D.I.C.E. Awards | Outstanding Character Performance - Male or Female | Far Cry 3 | Nominated | |
| 2013 | National Academy of Video Game Trade Reviewers Awards | Lead Performance, Drama | Far Cry 3 | Nominated | |
| 2013 | The 4th Canadian Videogame Awards | Best New Character | Far Cry 3 | Won | |
| 2014 | Canadian Screen Award | Best Guest Performance in a Drama Series | Rookie Blue | Nominated | |
| 2014 | Canadian Screen Award | Best Supporting Actor in a Drama Program or Series | Orphan Black | Nominated | |
| 2019 | Screen Actors Guild Awards | Outstanding Performance by an Ensemble in a Drama Series | Better Call Saul | Nominated | |
| 2021 | Screen Actors Guild Awards | Outstanding Performance by an Ensemble in a Drama Series | Better Call Saul | Nominated | |
| 2022 | Hollywood Critics Association | Best Supporting Actor in a Broadcast Cable/Drama Series | Better Call Saul | Nominated | |
| 2022 | Saturn Awards | Best Supporting Actor on Television | Better Call Saul | Nominated | |
