= La Chica o El Mundo =

- Pluribus episode
- Carol and Manousos communicate through a translator app on a smartphone.
- Episode no.: Season 1 Episode 9
- Directed by: Gordon Smith
- Written by: Alison Tatlock; Gordon Smith
- Cinematography by: Paul Donachie
- Editing by: Chris McCaleb
- Original air date: December 24, 2025
- Running time: 57 minutes

Guest appearance
- Darinka Arones as Kusimayu

Episode chronology
← Previous "Charm Offensive"	Next → —

"La Chica o El Mundo" (Note: transl. 'The Girl or the World') is the ninth episode and first season finale of the American post-apocalyptic science fiction television series Pluribus. The episode was written by executive producers Alison Tatlock and Gordon Smith, and directed by Smith. It was released on Apple TV on December 24, 2025.

The series is set in Albuquerque, New Mexico, and follows author Carol Sturka, who is one of only thirteen people in the world immune to the effects of "the Joining", resulting from an extraterrestrial virus that had transformed the world's human population into a peaceful and content hive mind (the "Others"). In the episode, Manousos finally reaches Albuquerque, leaving Carol to debate whether to help him in making a plan to destroy the Others.

The episode received critical acclaim, with critics praising the scenes between Carol and Manousos, the performances and the cliffhanger.

== Plot ==
Kusimayu, a teenaged girl from a rural Peruvian village and one of the immune, willingly inhales the custom virus made for her by the Others while the members of her village chant. She experiences a seizure and wakes soon after having joined the Others. The Others, including Kusimayu, immediately become silent, release their livestock and abandon the village.

About ten days prior, Manousos arrives in Albuquerque outside Carol's house. Carol invites him inside and tries to use a translation app on her phone to help them communicate, but Manousos fears the Others are eavesdropping and insists on talking outside, hiding their faces from drones using an umbrella. There, Manousos says that he believes if they cannot undo the Joining, they must kill the Others. Carol is reluctant to entertain his plan, refusing to continue the conversation outside and returning to her home. Manousos follows her and searches her house for any listening devices, finding a suspicious device in her liquor cabinet. Carol calls Zosia, who informs her that the device is a motion sensor that was placed there by Helen shortly after Carol had frozen her egg cells to monitor her drinking habits.

Carol offers Manousos a neighbor's home to stay at but he hesitates as they do not own it. Noticing that Carol is no longer determined to reverse the Joining, Manousos calls the Others on the phone, asking Zosia to visit him that night so he can interrogate her. Carol spots Zosia's car outside Manousos's house and rushes over to take Zosia away, but Manousos calls for another member of the Others to come. As Carol, upset, talks with Zosia, Zosia begins experiencing convulsions. Carol realizes that Manousos intentionally triggered a global seizure, which he was using to test the unusual radio frequency he had previously discovered, on the Others. Carol stops him by threatening him with a shotgun. When Zosia regains consciousness, she and the Others leave the city as they are scared of Manousos. Manousos expresses no regret and confronts Carol, asking whether she wants to "save the world or get the girl". Carol decides to leave with Zosia.

Over the next two weeks, Carol and Zosia travel around the world to entertain themselves. During their stay at a ski lodge, Zosia reveals Kusimayu's joining to Carol and confesses that the Others are working to extract Carol's stem cells from her frozen eggs, expecting to complete her custom virus in about a month. Dejected, Carol has Zosia return her home with a large crate. Carol tells Manousos she is ready to help him, and reveals that the crate contains an atom bomb.

== Production ==
The episode was written by executive producers Alison Tatlock and Gordon Smith, and directed by Smith. This marked Tatlock's second writing credit, Smith's second writing credit and Smith's third directing credit.

Gordon Smith said that the episode originally ended on a "much subtler" note, describing it as "a secret handshake between [Carol and Manousos], like her way of saying, 'I'm with you.'" However, executives at Sony Pictures Television and Apple TV felt that this ending would not sit well with the series' ambitious scale, which is what led to the writers deciding to place the atom bomb in Carol's house a day or two into shooting the episode. On the ending, Vince Gilligan said, "we think we know why she did it. Where it goes, we'll see, but she is a character who likes a bold gesture. Which is one of the things I love about her."

On having Carol and Manousos meeting for the first time, Alison Tatlock explained, "If it had happened a couple episodes earlier, maybe we'd have a different story, but by the time he gets there, she's in a completely different headspace. We, in the script even, had a moment where we, in a stage direction, referred to her kind of vaguely remembering that she made videos where she was calling everyone into action; it's not where her head is at anymore. And that's when he shows up, expecting the Carol Sturka that he saw on the video, and that person is a little bit dormant right now." Carlos-Manuel Vesga added, "I think it's endearing. There's something very compelling about them sharing this sense of urgency... and yet not finding a way of working together straight away. We actually don't know if it's going to work between them. But I remember reading that script and thinking, 'I love them even more now.'"

Smith considered the scene at the ski lodge, where Zosia reveals that the others are using Carol's frozen eggs to extract her stem cells, to be "heartbreaking", remarking, "it makes me sad when I watch it! It's not a big scene blocking-wise, so Rhea and Karolina have to make all these turns emotionally within a very constrained space, and I think they're just so fabulous to watch." Rhea Seehorn described Carol's thoughts, saying: "she's trying to allow herself to float in the direction of the current for a little while. Some of that's fatigue, some of it's delusion, some of it's desperation, some of it's grief, some of it's primal. But it's an act of suppression of other thoughts that probably sting even more. Most of us have been there where it hurts even more to be made a fool of if you actually knew it all along and didn't listen to yourself."

Shots of Carol and Zosia's world tour were filmed in Big Sky, Montana. The final part of these sequence was taken at the resort at Moonlight Basin in Big Sky, which was closed at the time due to a recent fire but the crew given permission to film there. Initially, production had planned to film this at a cottage in Spain, but had to scrap the shot due to rainy weather and actor illnesses. Tony Dalton, who played Lalo Salamanca on Better Call Saul, has an uncredited performance as the voice of the Others when Manousos calls them.

The episode first aired on December 24, 2025, two days earlier than the Friday release schedule due to the holiday season.

== Reception ==
"La Chica o El Mundo" earned critical acclaim. Scott Collura of IGN gave the episode an "amazing" 9 out of 10 rating and wrote in his verdict, "Pluribus Season 1 ends on a strong note that's both hilarious and scary. Opening with a truly chilling scene with the young Kusimayu, whose fate not only foreshadows what Carol could be in for but also what all of human culture has already lost, 'La Chica o El Mundo' also finally unites Carol with Manousos... and not surprisingly the wrong kind of sparks fly. Plus, Carol's relationship with Zosia comes to an abrupt end with the reveal that the Joined have figured out a way to infect her, whether she likes it or not, neatly setting up a Season 2 that is already on my most anticipated shows list."

Noel Murray of The A.V. Club gave the episode an "A–" grade and wrote, "We'll have to wait for season two to learn how Carol plans to use [the atom bomb] — if she has a plan at all. But we don't need to wonder why she's feeling so apocalyptic. We can see it in the stricken look she gives to Zosia before she steps off the helicopter and says goodbye... perhaps forever."

Scott Tobias of Vulture gave the episode a perfect 5 star rating out of 5 and wrote, "Carol's return home via helicopter, with mysterious cargo dangling from below, is the perfect season-ending coda. 'You win,' she tells Manousos flatly. 'We save the world.' He's curious about the cargo. It's something a little heartier than a grenade. If season one was Invasion of the Body Snatchers, perhaps season two will be more like War of the Worlds." Carly Lane of Collider gave the episode a perfect 10 out of 10 rating and wrote, "This week's episode, "La Chica o El Mundo," co-written by Alison Tatlock and director Gordon Smith, explicitly spells it out — Carol can either get the girl or save the world, but she'll never be able to have both, and as she comes to that devastating realization for herself, the finale sets up an even more explosive Season 2 (possibly literally)."

Alison Herman of Variety wrote, "To me, enjoying Pluribus isn't about eating one's cultural vegetables. It's about enjoying a strange, absurd, uncategorizable show that's also thoughtful and restrained. And it's about Carol Sturka, a highly specific person whose unease with others is nonetheless broadly accessible. I'd never exchange her spiky, pushy personality for permanent affability, and I understand why she wouldn't either." Judy Berman of TIME wrote, "What’s thrilling about Pluribus is its moral uncertainty. Some things, like the future of humanity, are more important than one woman's happiness, it suggests. But in a war between billions of pod people who've achieved world peace (never mind that they subsist on human remains) and two fallible, self-righteous curmudgeons with an A-bomb, who are you rooting for?"

Sean T. Collins of Decider wrote, "The Joined claim they contain the thoughts and feelings of every person — but not every thought and feeling. If the new Kusimayu, or the collective inhabiting her body, doesn't care for that goat the way she does, then something important about her has been lost, forever. Maybe she's happier, but she isn't really 'she' anymore. That's why, whatever else it is, Pluribus is a horror story." Daniel Chin of The Ringer wrote, "It always seemed likely that Carol and Manousos's prickly, strong-willed personalities would clash — but their long-anticipated introduction in the season finale goes even worse than anticipated, as Carol shifts her priorities."

Josh Rosenberg of Esquire wrote, "Where other sci-fi shows show us a vision of the future through flying cars and laser guns and jet packs and cities on other planets, Pluribus's fantastical concept is mere window dressing for what it's really showing us: our emotional future. A world so devoid of understanding and connection that we would consider giving up what makes us human just to feel something. Anything." Carissa Pavlica of TV Fanatic gave the episode a 4.7 star rating out of 5 and wrote, "I have no idea what to expect from Pluribus Season 2, but one thing I can't stop thinking about is that maybe Carol will not let Zosia go. What she learned about Zosia before the joining could keep her hooked."
