= Critics' Choice Television Award for Best Actress in a Drama Series =

Television award

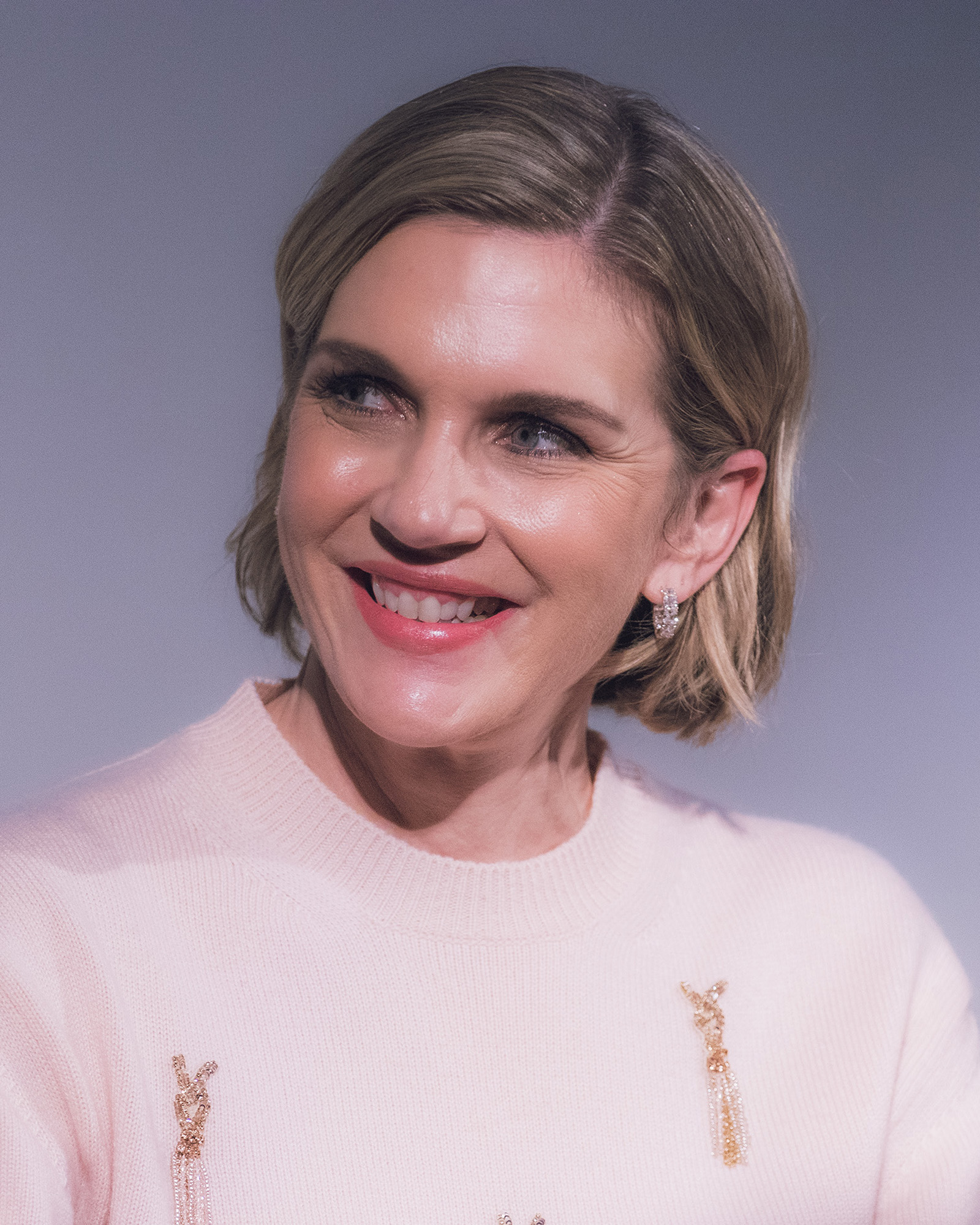
- The 2026 recipient: Rhea Seehorn
- Country: United States
- Presented by: Critics Choice Association
- First award: 2011
- Currently held by: Rhea Seehorn – Pluribus (2026)
- Website: criticschoice.com

The Critics' Choice Television Award for Best Actress in a Drama Series is an award presented annually by the Critics' Choice Television Awards to recognize the work of television actresses in the drama genre.

It was introduced in 2011, when the awards ceremony was first initiated. The winners are voted for by television critics who are members of the Broadcast Television Critics Association.

Tatiana Maslany received the most awards in this category, winning consecutively in 2013 and 2014 for Orphan Black. Keri Russell has received the most nominations with 8 for both The Americans and The Diplomat.

== Winners and nominees ==
indicates the winner

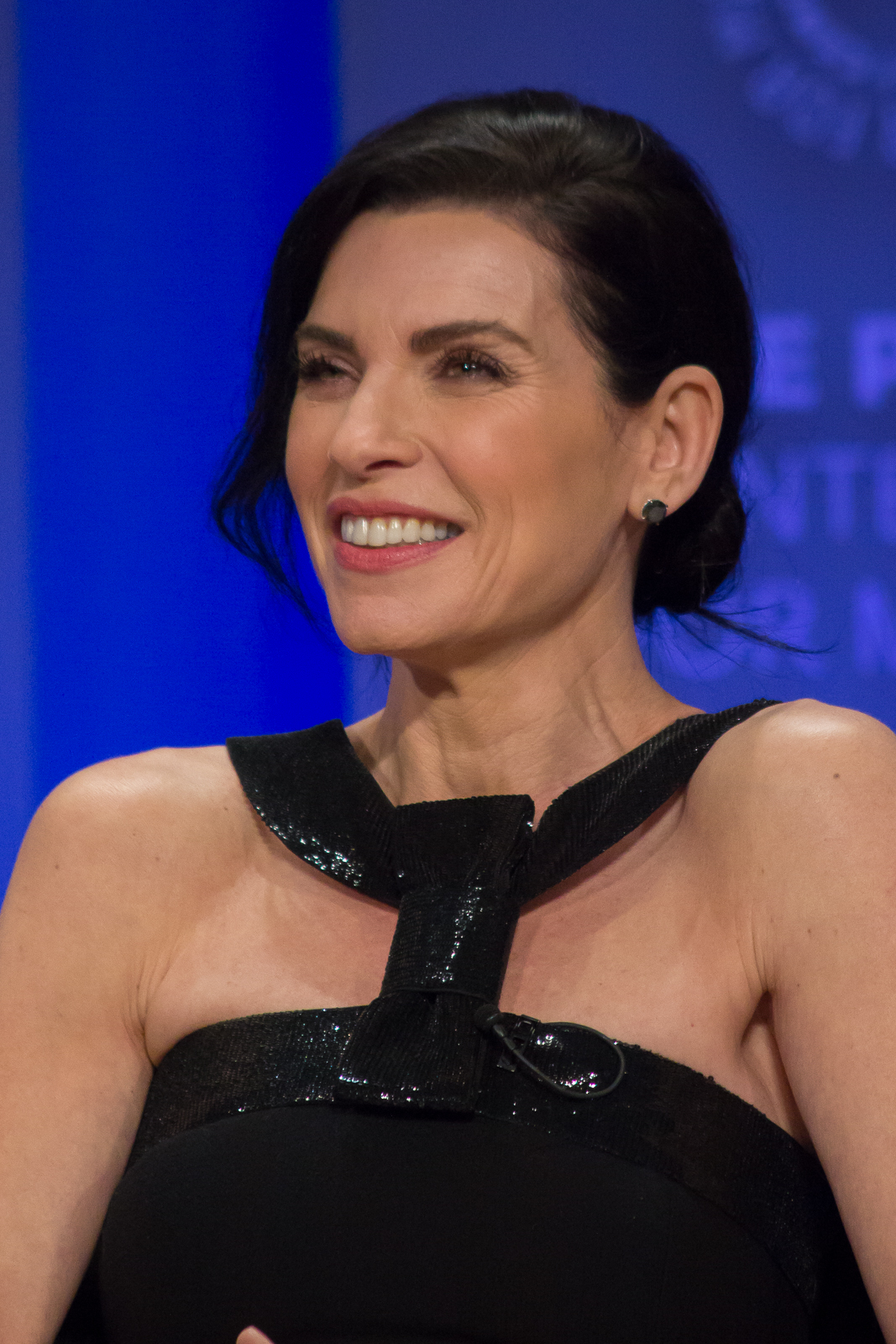
Julianna Margulies won for The Good Wife (2011)

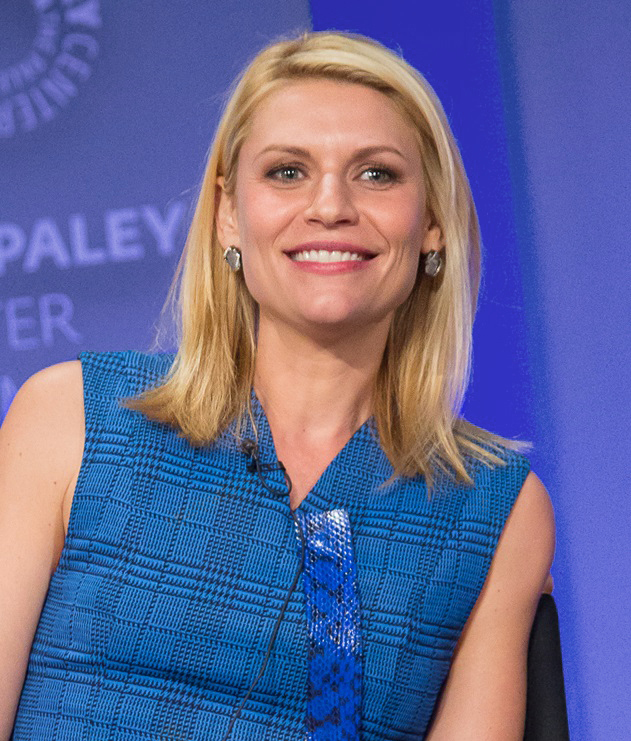
Claire Danes won for Homeland (2012)

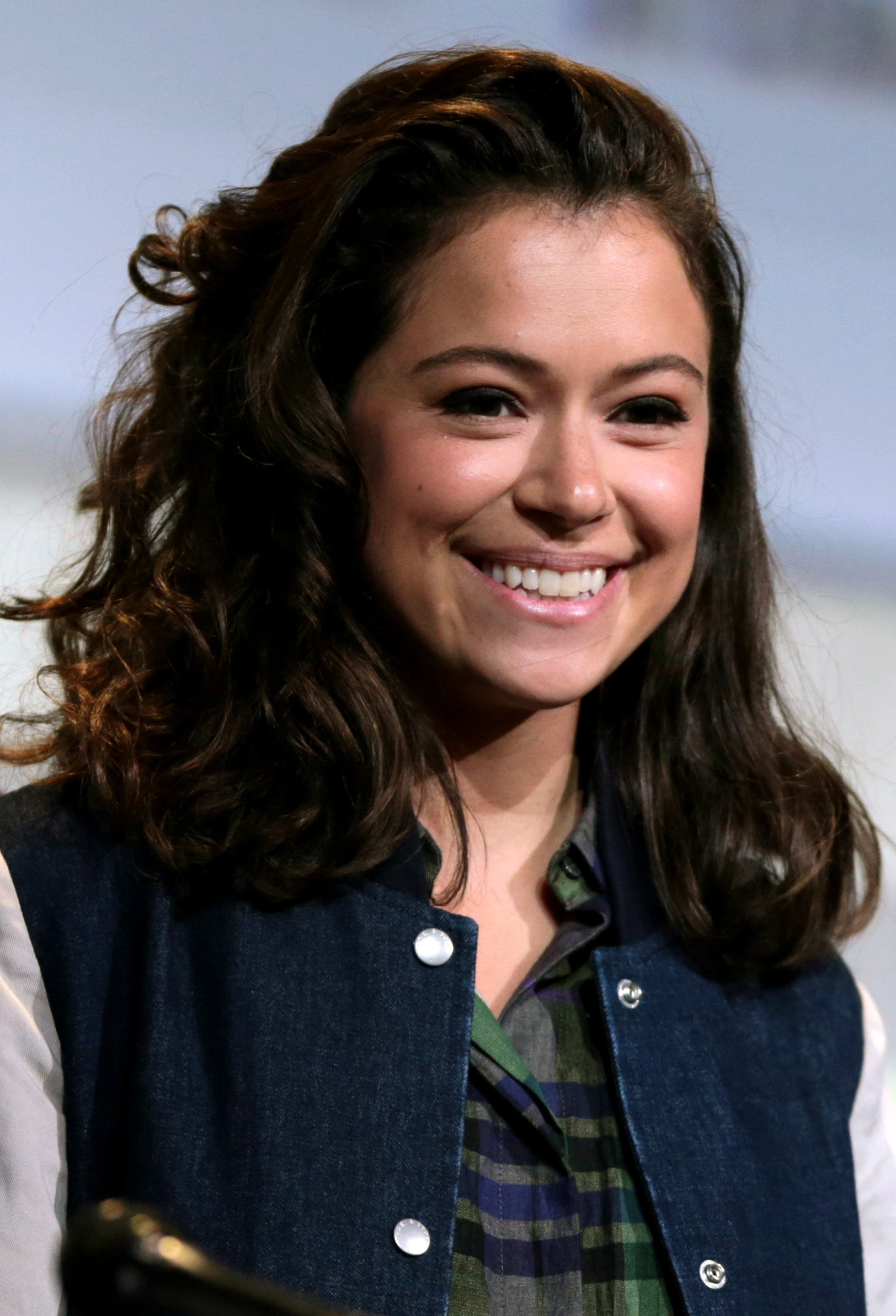
Tatiana Maslany won twice for Orphan Black (2013, 2014)

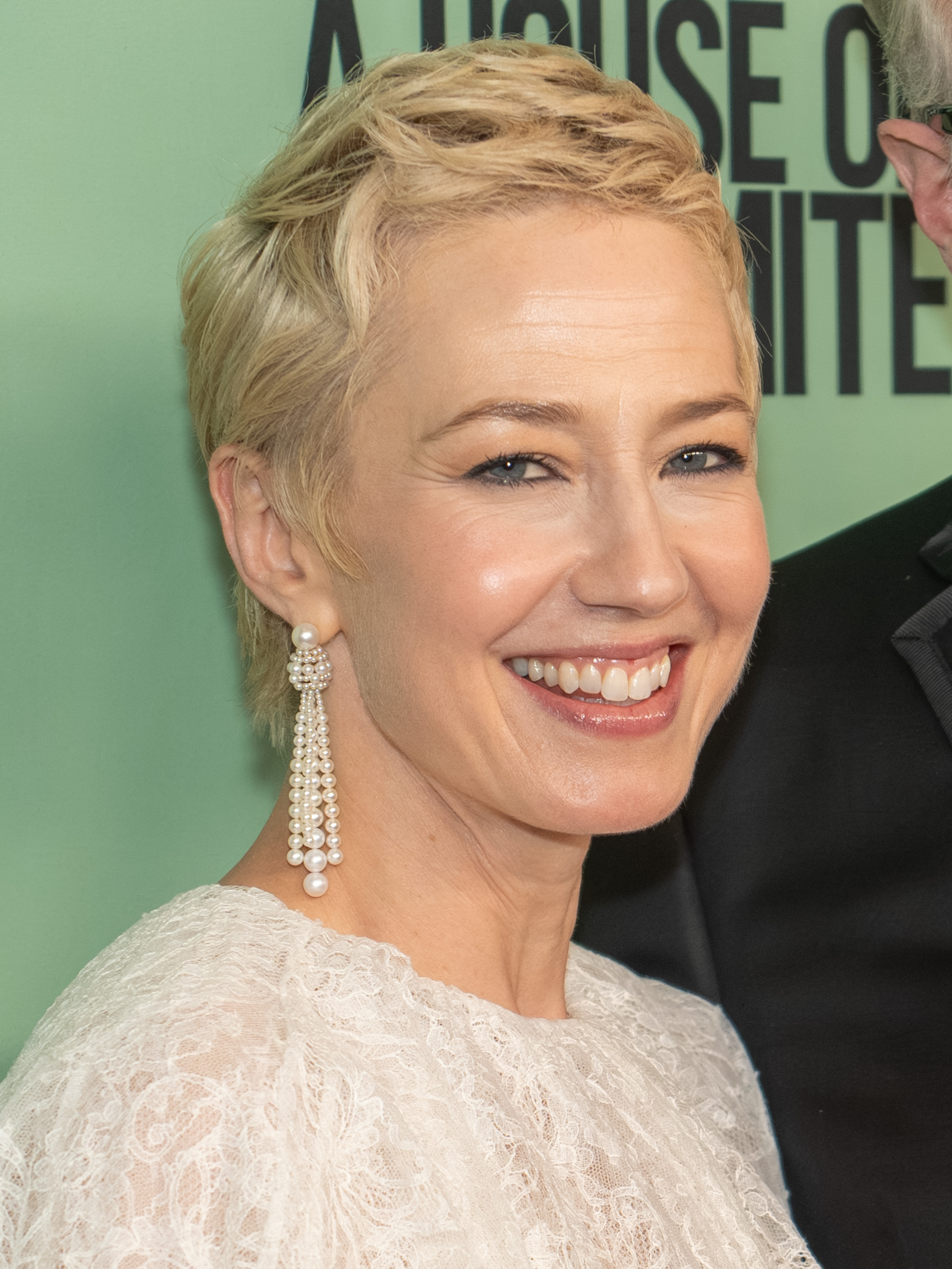
Carrie Coon won for The Leftovers (2016)

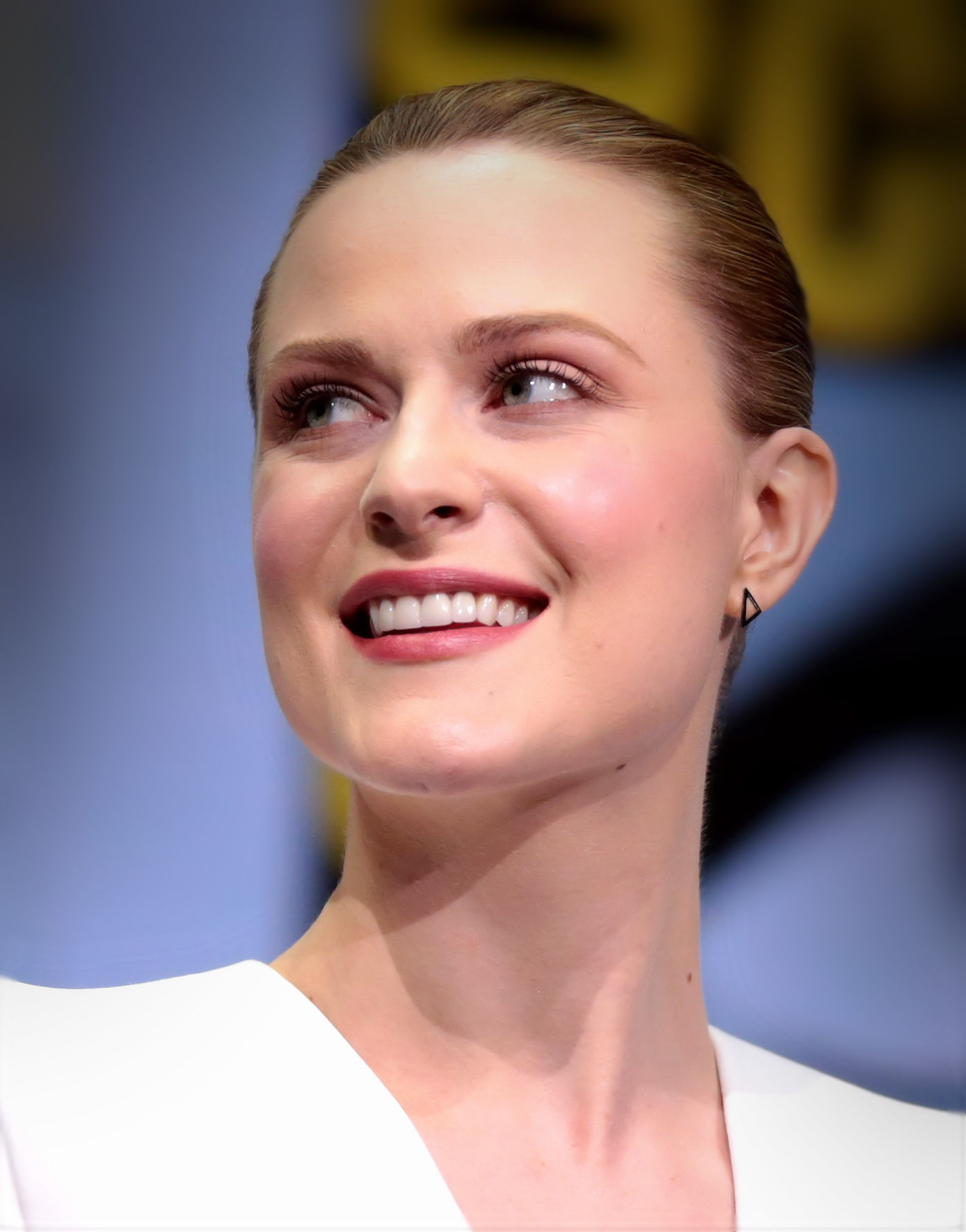
Evan Rachel Wood won for Westworld (2016)

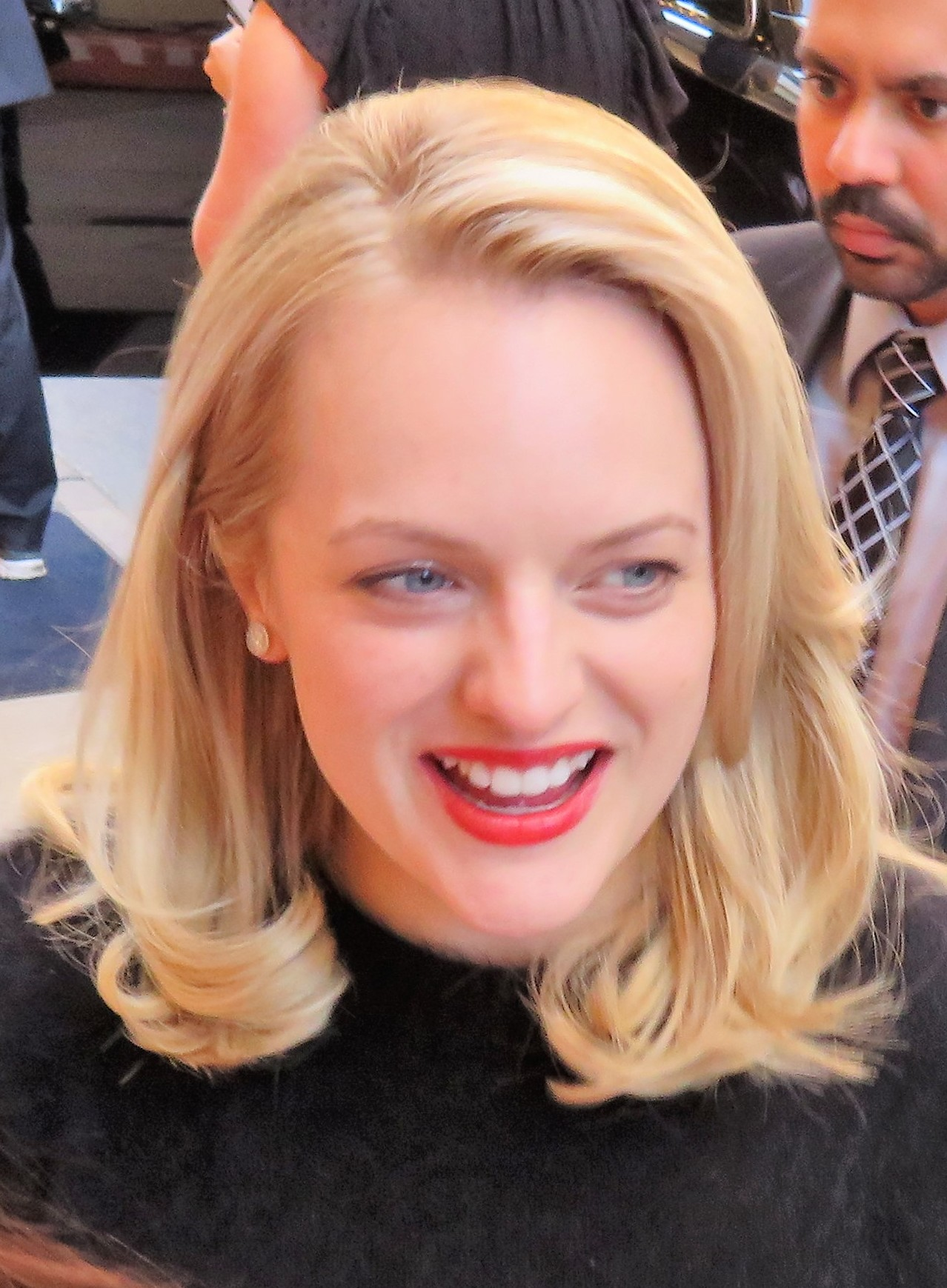
Elisabeth Moss won for The Handmaid's Tale (2018)

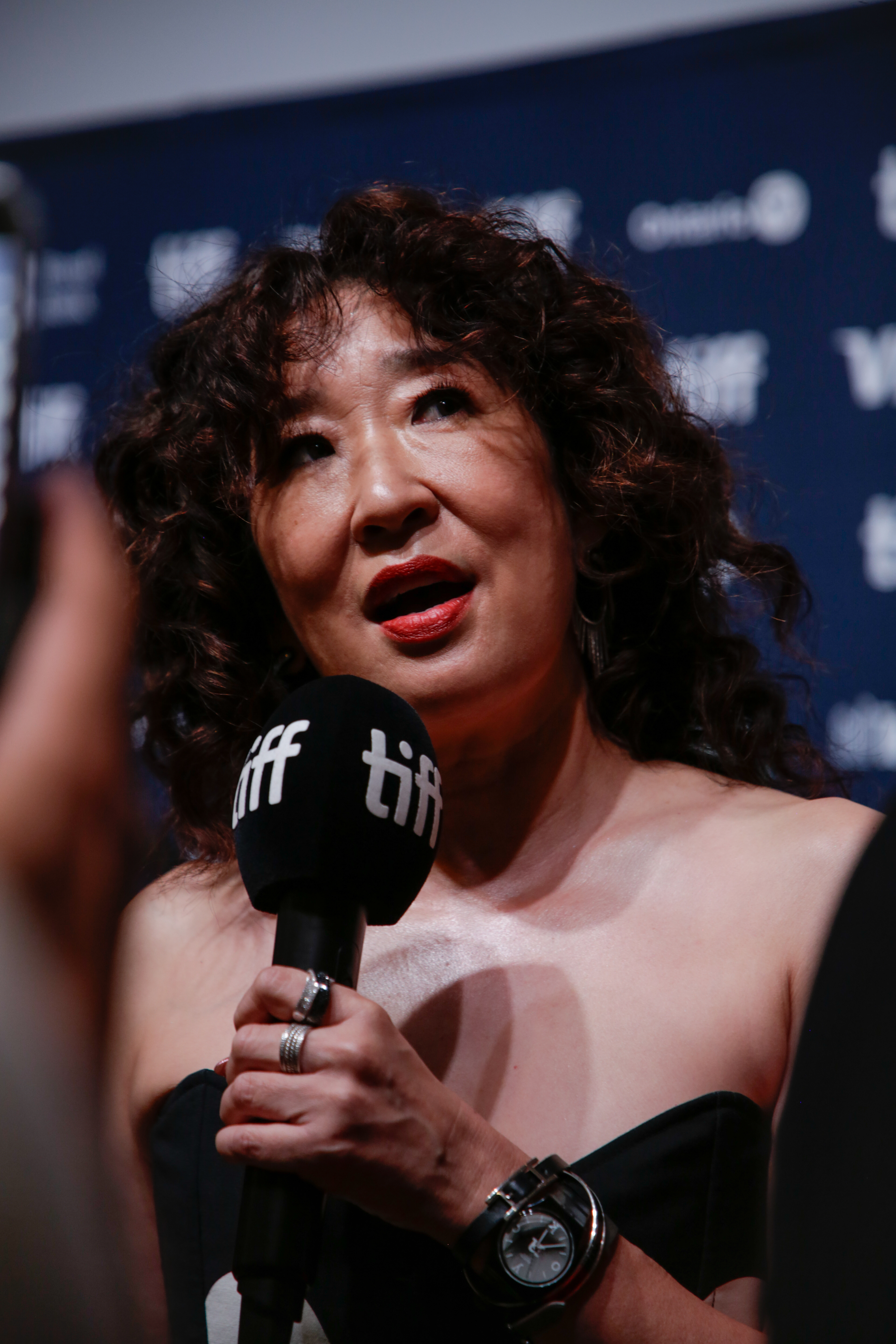
Sandra Oh won for Killing Eve (2019)

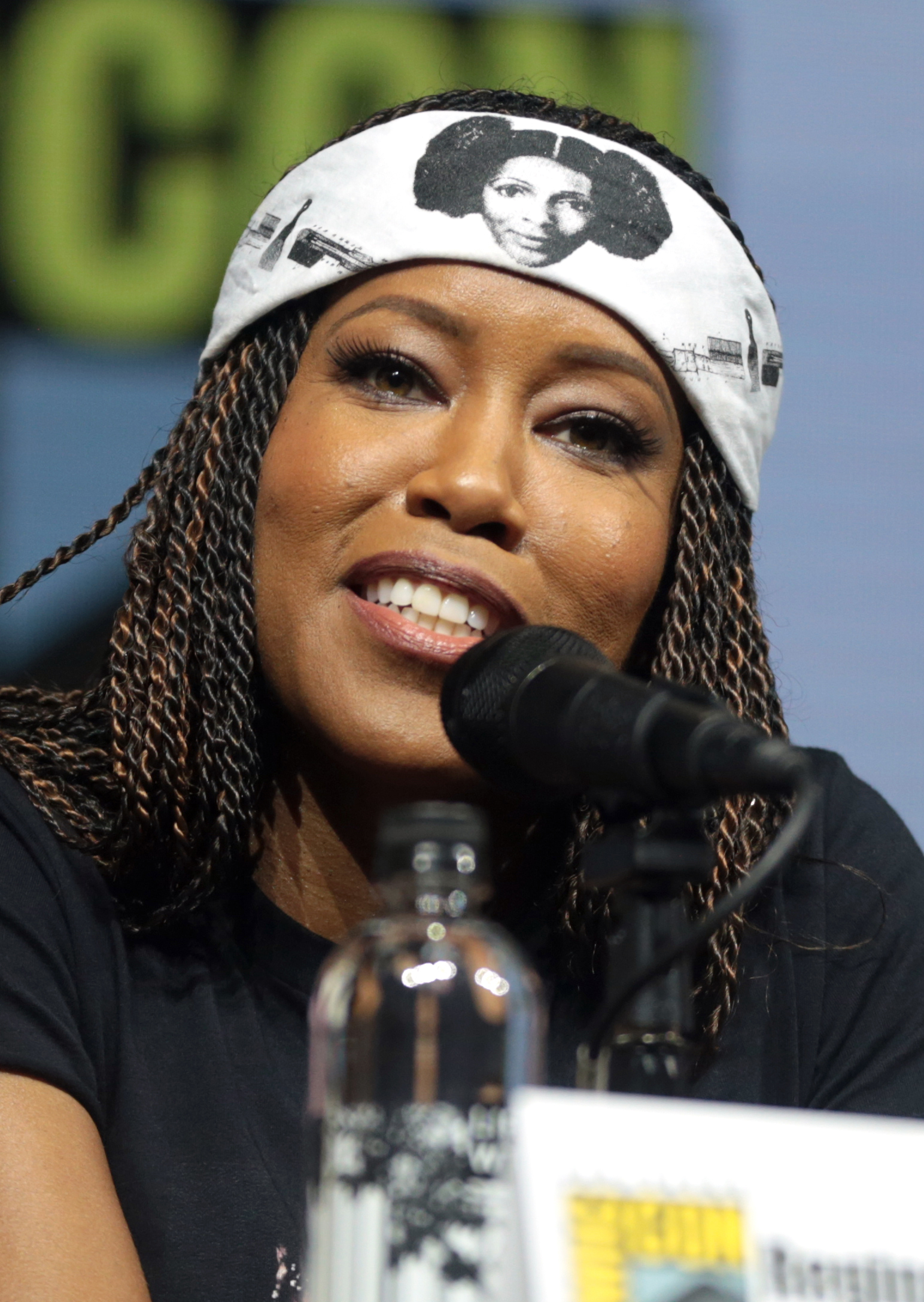
Regina King won for Watchmen (2020)

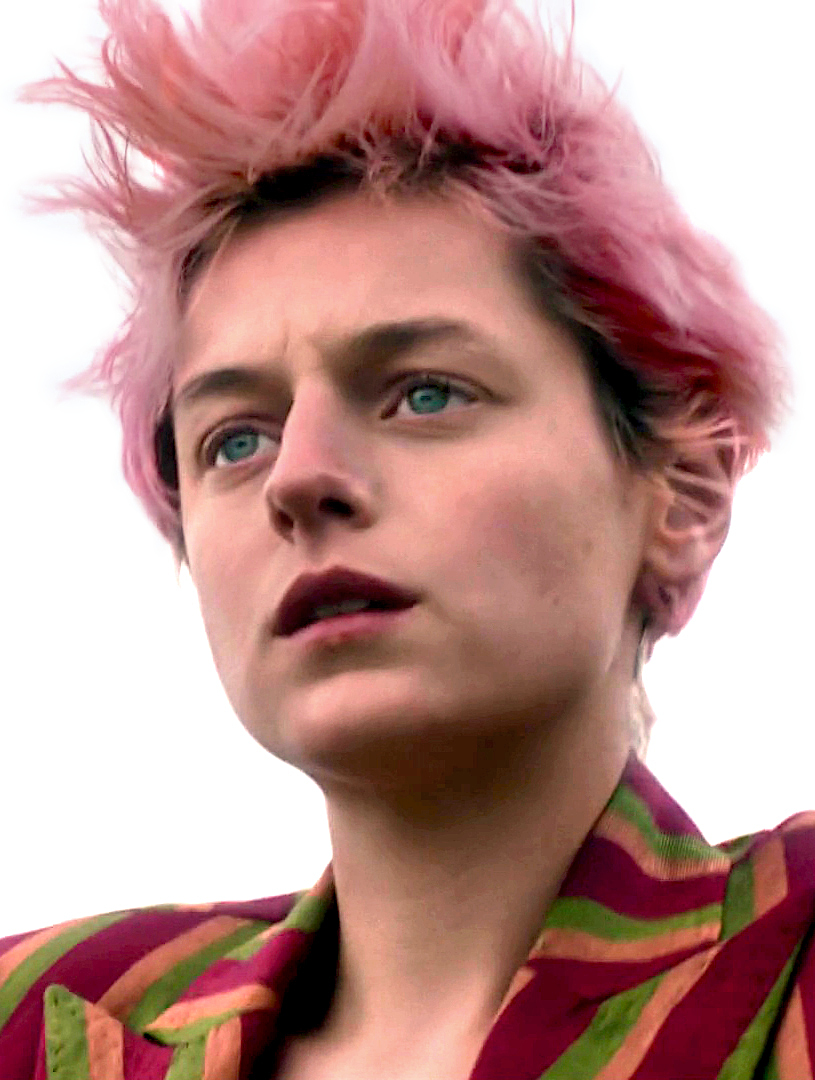
Emma Corrin won for The Crown (2021)

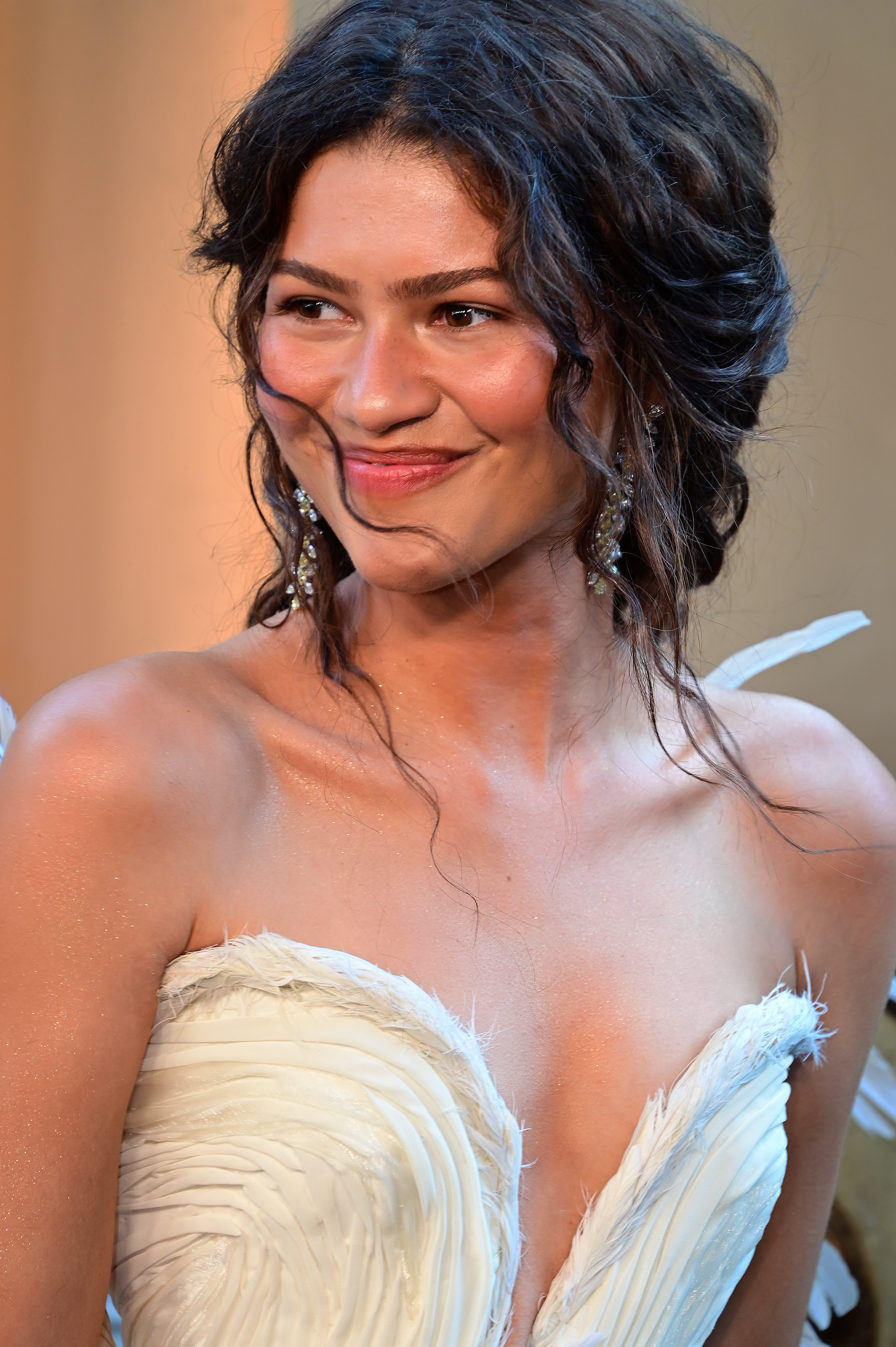
Zendaya won for Euphoria (2023)

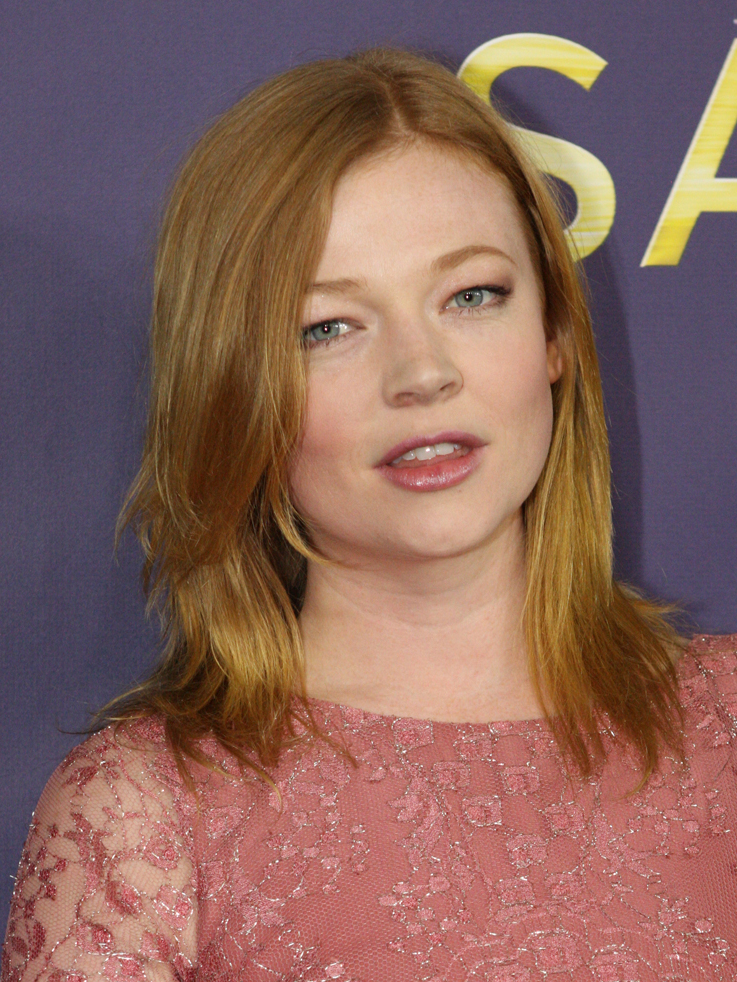
Sarah Snook won for Succession (2024)

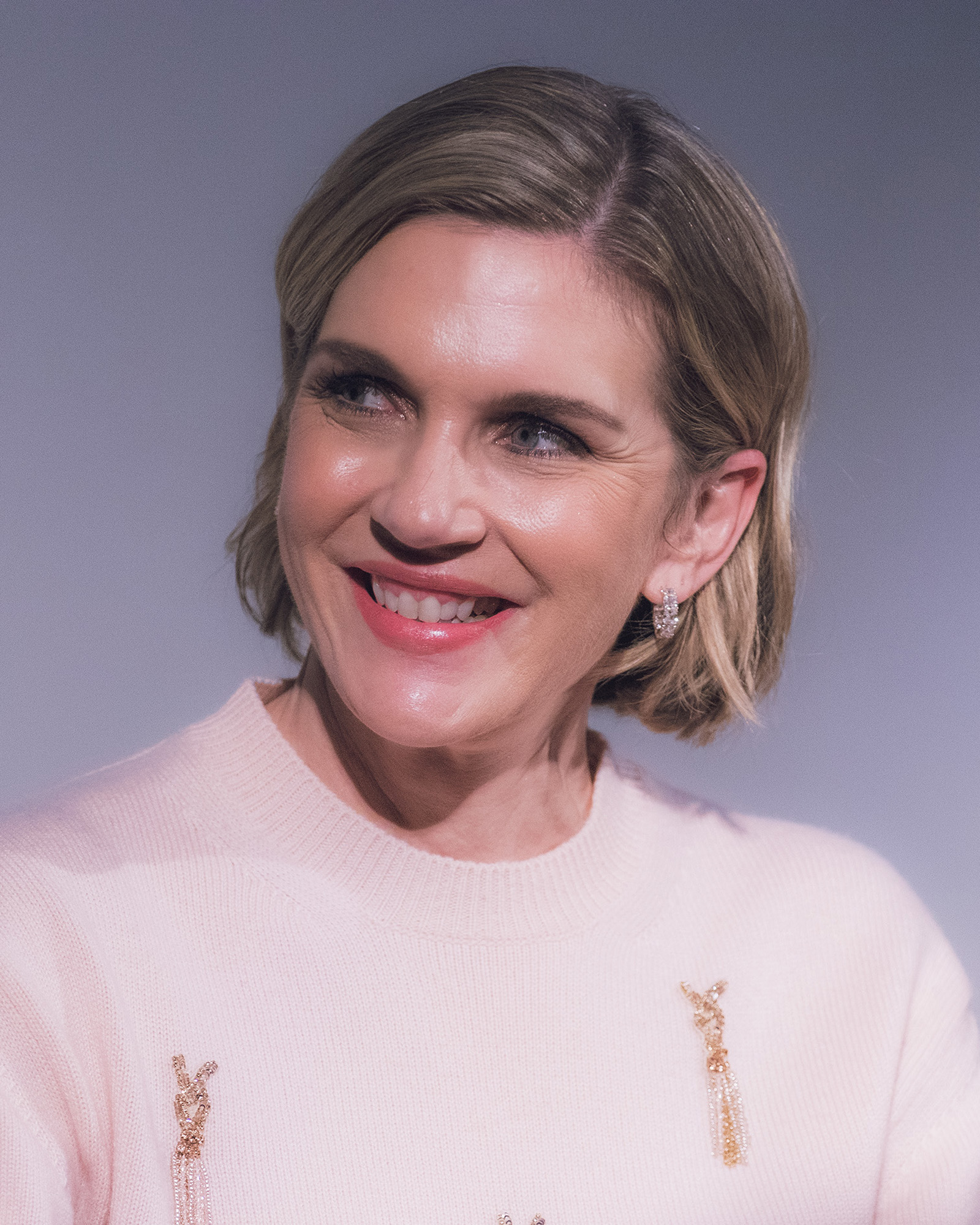
Rhea Seehorn won for Pluribus (2026)

=== 2010s ===
Year	Actress	Program	Role	Network
2011	Julianna Margulies	The Good Wife	Alicia Florrick	CBS
2011	Connie Britton	Friday Night Lights	Tami Taylor	NBC
2011	Mireille Enos	The Killing	Det. Sarah Linden	AMC
2011	Elisabeth Moss	Mad Men	Peggy Olson	AMC
2011	Katey Sagal	Sons of Anarchy	Gemma Teller Morrow	FX
2011	Anna Torv	Fringe	Olivia Dunham	Fox
2012	Claire Danes	Homeland	Carrie Mathison	Showtime
2012	Michelle Dockery	Downton Abbey	Lady Mary Crawley	PBS
2012	Julianna Margulies	The Good Wife	Alicia Florrick	CBS
2012	Elisabeth Moss	Mad Men	Peggy Olson	AMC
2012	Emmy Rossum	Shameless	Fiona Gallagher	Showtime
2012	Katey Sagal	Sons of Anarchy	Gemma Teller Morrow	FX
2013	Tatiana Maslany	Orphan Black	Various Characters	BBC
2013	Claire Danes	Homeland	Carrie Mathison	Showtime
2013	Vera Farmiga	Bates Motel	Norma Bates	A&E
2013	Julianna Margulies	The Good Wife	Alicia Florrick	CBS
2013	Elisabeth Moss	Mad Men	Peggy Olson	AMC
2013	Keri Russell	The Americans	Elizabeth Jennings	FX
2014	Tatiana Maslany	Orphan Black	Various Characters	BBC
2014	Lizzy Caplan	Masters of Sex	Virginia E. Johnson	Showtime
2014	Vera Farmiga	Bates Motel	Norma Bates	A&E
2014	Julianna Margulies	The Good Wife	Alicia Florrick	CBS
2014	Keri Russell	The Americans	Elizabeth Jennings	FX
2014	Robin Wright	House of Cards	Claire Underwood	Netflix
2015	Taraji P. Henson	Empire	Cookie Lyon	Fox
2015	Viola Davis	How to Get Away with Murder	Annalise Keating	ABC
2015	Vera Farmiga	Bates Motel	Norma Bates	A&E
2015	Eva Green	Penny Dreadful	Vanessa Ives	Showtime
2015	Julianna Margulies	The Good Wife	Alicia Florrick	CBS
2015	Keri Russell	The Americans	Elizabeth Jennings	FX
2016 (1)	Carrie Coon	The Leftovers	Nora Durst	HBO
2016 (1)	Shiri Appleby	UnREAL	Rachel Goldberg	Lifetime
2016 (1)	Viola Davis	How to Get Away with Murder	Annalise Keating	ABC
2016 (1)	Eva Green	Penny Dreadful	Vanessa Ives	Showtime
2016 (1)	Taraji P. Henson	Empire	Cookie Lyon	Fox
2016 (1)	Krysten Ritter	Jessica Jones	Jessica Jones	Netflix
2016 (2)	Evan Rachel Wood	Westworld	Dolores Abernathy	HBO
2016 (2)	Caitríona Balfe	Outlander	Claire Fraser	Starz
2016 (2)	Viola Davis	How to Get Away with Murder	Annalise Keating	ABC
2016 (2)	Tatiana Maslany	Orphan Black	Various Characters	BBC
2016 (2)	Keri Russell	The Americans	Elizabeth Jennings	FX
2016 (2)	Robin Wright	House of Cards	Claire Underwood	Netflix
2018	Elisabeth Moss	The Handmaid's Tale	June Osborne/Offred	Hulu
2018	Caitríona Balfe	Outlander	Claire Fraser	Starz
2018	Christine Baranski	The Good Fight	Diane Lockhart	CBS All Access
2018	Claire Foy	The Crown	Queen Elizabeth II	Netflix
2018	Tatiana Maslany	Orphan Black	Various Characters	BBC
2018	Robin Wright	House of Cards	Claire Underwood	Netflix
2019	Sandra Oh	Killing Eve	Eve Polastri	BBC
2019	Jodie Comer	Killing Eve	Villanelle	BBC
2019	Maggie Gyllenhaal	The Deuce	Eileen Merrell / Candy	HBO
2019	Elisabeth Moss	The Handmaid's Tale	June Osborne / Offred	Hulu
2019	Elizabeth Olsen	Sorry for Your Loss	Leigh Shaw	Facebook Watch
2019	Julia Roberts	Homecoming	Heidi Bergman	Amazon Prime Video
2019	Keri Russell	The Americans	Elizabeth Jennings	FX

=== 2020s ===
Year	Actress	Program	Role	Network
2020	Regina King	Watchmen	Angela Abar / Sister Night	HBO
2020	Christine Baranski	The Good Fight	Diane Lockhart	CBS All Access
2020	Olivia Colman	The Crown	Queen Elizabeth II	Netflix
2020	Jodie Comer	Killing Eve	Villanelle	BBC
2020	Nicole Kidman	Big Little Lies	Celeste Wright	HBO
2020	Michaela Jaé Rodriguez	Pose	Blanca Evangelista	FX
2020	Sarah Snook	Succession	Siobhan "Shiv" Roy	HBO
2020	Zendaya	Euphoria	Rue Bennett	HBO
2021	Emma Corrin	The Crown	Diana, Princess of Wales	Netflix
2021	Christine Baranski	The Good Fight	Diane Lockhart	CBS All Access
2021	Olivia Colman	The Crown	Queen Elizabeth II	Netflix
2021	Claire Danes	Homeland	Carrie Mathison	Showtime
2021	Laura Linney	Ozark	Wendy Byrde	Netflix
2021	Jurnee Smollett	Lovecraft Country	Letitia "Leti" Lewis	HBO
2022	Melanie Lynskey	Yellowjackets	Adult Shauna Shipman	Showtime
2022	Uzo Aduba	In Treatment	Dr. Brooke Taylor	HBO
2022	Chiara Aurelia	Cruel Summer	Jeanette Turner	Freeform
2022	Christine Baranski	The Good Fight	Diane Lockhart	Paramount+
2022	Katja Herbers	Evil	Dr. Kristen Bouchard	Paramount+
2022	Michaela Jaé Rodriguez	Pose	Blanca Evangelista	FX
2023	Zendaya	Euphoria	Rue Bennett	HBO
2023	Christine Baranski	The Good Fight	Diane Lockhart	Paramount+
2023	Sharon Horgan	Bad Sisters	Eva Garvey	Apple TV+
2023	Laura Linney	Ozark	Wendy Byrde	Netflix
2023	Mandy Moore	This Is Us	Rebecca Pearson	NBC
2023	Kelly Reilly	Yellowstone	Beth Dutton	Paramount Network
2024	Sarah Snook	Succession	Siobhan "Shiv" Roy	HBO
2024	Jennifer Aniston	The Morning Show	Alex Levy	Apple TV+
2024	Aunjanue Ellis-Taylor	Justified: City Primeval	Carolyn Wilder	FX
2024	Bella Ramsey	The Last of Us	Ellie	HBO
2024	Keri Russell	The Diplomat	Ambassador Kate Wyler	Netflix
2024	Reese Witherspoon	The Morning Show	Bradley Jackson	Apple TV+
2025
2025	Kathy Bates	Matlock	Madeline Matlock	CBS
2025	Caitríona Balfe	Outlander	Claire Fraser	Starz
2025	Shanola Hampton	Found	Gabi Mosely	NBC
2025	Keira Knightley	Black Doves	Helen Webb	Netflix
2025	Keri Russell	The Diplomat	Ambassador Kate Wyler	Netflix
2025	Anna Sawai	Shōgun	Toda Mariko	FX / Hulu
2026
2026	Rhea Seehorn	Pluribus	Carol Sturka	Apple TV
2026	Kathy Bates	Matlock	Madeline Matlock	CBS
2026	Carrie Coon	The Gilded Age	Bertha Russell	HBO
2026	Britt Lower	Severance	Helly R.	Apple TV
2026	Bella Ramsey	The Last of Us	Ellie	HBO
2026	Keri Russell	The Diplomat	Ambassador Kate Wyler	Netflix

== Multiple wins ==
=== 2 wins ===
- Tatiana Maslany (consecutive)

== Multiple nominations ==
=== 8 nominations ===
- Keri Russell

=== 5 nominations ===
- Christine Baranski
- Julianna Margulies
- Elisabeth Moss

=== 4 nominations ===
- Tatiana Maslany

=== 3 nominations ===
- Caitríona Balfe
- Claire Danes
- Viola Davis
- Vera Farmiga
- Robin Wright

=== 2 nominations ===
- Kathy Bates
- Olivia Colman
- Jodie Comer
- Carrie Coon
- Eva Green
- Taraji P. Henson
- Laura Linney
- Bella Ramsey
- Michaela Jaé Rodriguez
- Katey Sagal
- Sarah Snook
- Zendaya

== See also ==
- TCA Award for Individual Achievement in Drama
- Golden Globe Award for Best Actress – Television Series Drama
- Primetime Emmy Award for Outstanding Lead Actress in a Drama Series
- Screen Actors Guild Award for Outstanding Performance by a Female Actor in a Drama Series
