= Manousos Oviedo =

Fictional character from the television series Pluribus

- Pluribus character
- First appearance: "Grenade" (2025)
- Portrayed by: Carlos Manuel Vesga

In-universe information
- Occupation: Self storage manager
- Home: Asunción, Paraguay
- Nationality: Colombian

Manousos Oviedo is a fictional character in the Apple TV science fiction television series Pluribus, portrayed by Colombian actor Carlos Manuel Vesga. A Colombian immigrant living in Asunción, Paraguay, Manousos manages a self storage facility and is one of thirteen people known to be immune to the extraterrestrial phenomenon known as the Joining, which transforms most of humanity into a collective consciousness known as the Others.

Manousos refuses to interact with or accept assistance from the Others, regarding the collective as an occupying force and the goods it distributes as stolen property. His uncompromising individualism serves as a contrast to protagonist Carol Sturka, whose attitude toward the Others becomes increasingly ambivalent over the course of the first season. Vesga's performance as Manousos received a nomination for the Primetime Emmy Award for Outstanding Supporting Actor in a Drama Series in 2026.

== Appearances ==
Following the Joining, Manousos isolates himself inside the self storage facility he manages in Paraguay. Refusing food and other assistance offered by the Others, he survives partly on supplies found in abandoned storage units while methodically scanning radio frequencies in an attempt to understand what has happened. When Carol attempts to telephone him, he initially believes that she is another manifestation of the collective. Her anger eventually convinces him that she remains an individual, as the Others are incapable of expressing anger in the same manner.

After receiving a recorded message from Carol calling for resistance to the Joining, Manousos leaves Paraguay to meet her in Albuquerque, New Mexico. He refuses assistance from the Others throughout the journey, siphoning fuel from abandoned vehicles while leaving payment for their owners and teaching himself basic English in preparation for meeting Carol. At the Darién Gap, he rejects an offer by the Others to transport him and his car, arguing that nothing they possess is legitimately theirs. He burns the car and attempts to cross the Gap on foot, but is badly injured after falling into a chunga palm and is eventually rescued by the Others.

Manousos ultimately reaches Albuquerque, where his anticipated alliance with Carol is complicated by her growing romantic attachment to Zosia, the principal representative of the Others assigned to her. The two also disagree over whether members of the collective should be treated as the people they were before the Joining. Manousos experiments on one of the Others using a radio frequency he has been investigating, producing a seizure throughout the collective before Carol forces him to stop.

Carol initially leaves Albuquerque with Zosia. After discovering that the Others intend to use her previously frozen eggs to develop a method of assimilating her without the procedure she had refused, Carol returns to Manousos and agrees to work with him to reverse the Joining, bringing with her an atomic bomb supplied by the collective.

== Development and casting ==
Casting director Sharon Bialy said that the production conducted an extensive search for the actor who would play Manousos, employing a South American casting director and considering numerous audition tapes. Bialy said the production was drawn to Vesga's ability to convey a character's internal life without dialogue, an important quality because significant portions of Manousos's storyline are nearly silent.

Vesga has said that he deliberately played Manousos's circumstances as drama rather than attempting to emphasize their comedic aspects. He regarded the character's seriousness and inflexibility as what allowed the humor in his scenes to emerge naturally. Vesga also interpreted Manousos's background as a Colombian immigrant in Paraguay as significant to his resistance to the Joining, reasoning that migration involves the loss and reconstruction of identity and therefore informs the character's determination to preserve his individuality. Speaking to Variety, Vesga explained that "he's someone who has lost before, and now he goes, 'You know what? Not again!' "

Much of the seventh episode, "The Gap", is devoted to Manousos's journey north through Latin America and contains little dialogue. Vesga later said that portraying the journey caused him to reflect on the experiences of real migrants who travel through the Darién Gap. Jungle sequences for the episode were filmed partly in the Canary Islands and partly in New Mexico; replicas of Manousos's MG Midget were constructed so filming could take place on both sides of the Atlantic.

== Reception ==
Manousos received positive attention following his introduction. Writing for /Film, Pauli Poisuo described him as the series' "breakout character", arguing that he was the first supporting character to make as immediate an impression as Carol. Decider subsequently published multiple articles focused specifically on the character, with Nicole Gallucci praising his resilience, self-sufficiency and adherence to his principles during his journey to Albuquerque.

Critical discussion particularly focused on "The Gap". Daniel Chin of The Ringer wrote that the largely wordless episode developed Manousos through his actions and contrasted his uncompromising self-reliance with Carol's increasing dependence on the Others. Noel Murray of The A.V. Club similarly praised the Manousos section of the episode as a "gripping survival drama" in miniature and highlighted the contrast between his physically punishing journey and Carol's comparatively comfortable isolation.

Vesga's portrayal subsequently received a nomination for Outstanding Supporting Actor in a Drama Series at the 78th Primetime Emmy Awards, his first Emmy nomination. The award ultimately went to Tom Pelphrey for his performance in Task.
