= Pluribus (TV series) =

American science fiction TV series

- Genre: Black comedy; Drama; Post-apocalyptic; Psychological thriller; Science fiction
- Created by: Vince Gilligan
- Showrunner: Vince Gilligan
- Starring: Rhea Seehorn; Karolina Wydra; Carlos-Manuel Vesga; Samba Schutte
- Composer: Dave Porter
- Country of origin: United States
- Original languages: English; Spanish
- No. of seasons: 1
- No. of episodes: 9

Production
- Executive producers: Vince Gilligan; Jeff Frost; Diane Mercer; Allyce Ozarski; Gordon Smith; Alison Tatlock
- Production location: Albuquerque, New Mexico
- Cinematography: Marshall Adams; Paul Donachie
- Editors: Skip Macdonald; Chris McCaleb; Joey Liew
- Camera setup: Single-camera
- Running time: 42–63 minutes
- Production companies: High Bridge Productions; Bristol Circle Entertainment; Sony Pictures Television

Original release
- Network: Apple TV
- Release: November 7, 2025 – present

Pluribus (Note: Stylised as PLUR1BUS, with the numerative "1" symbolising Seehorn's character Carol Sturka.) is an American post-apocalyptic science fiction television series created by Vince Gilligan for Apple TV. Set and filmed primarily in Albuquerque, New Mexico, the series follows novelist Carol Sturka (Rhea Seehorn), who finds herself isolated after an alien virus transforms the rest of humanity into a peaceful and content hive mind, which nevertheless seeks to assimilate her and other immune individuals.

The series premiered on Apple TV on November 7, 2025. A second season has been ordered. The title of the series refers to e pluribus unum, a Latin motto of the United States which means 'out of many, one'. Pluribus has received acclaim from critics, with praise for Gilligan's writing and direction and Seehorn's performance, as well as the show's originality, tone, and stylistic influences, though its pacing received some criticism.

Pluribus has received numerous accolades. It won six Primetime Emmy Awards, including Outstanding Lead Actress in a Drama Series for Seehorn and Outstanding Writing for a Drama Series for Gilligan, while also being nominated for Outstanding Drama Series. It has also been nominated for two Golden Globe Awards and two Critics' Choice Awards, with Seehorn winning Best Actress in a Drama Series at both ceremonies. Additionally, the series was honored with a Peabody Award and was named one of the ten best television programs of 2025 by the American Film Institute.

== Premise ==
Pluribus follows Albuquerque author Carol Sturka, who is one of only 13 people in the world immune to the effects of the "Joining", an event in which an extraterrestrial virus transformed the rest of humanity into a peaceful and content hive mind known as the "Others". The hive mind happily accommodates the wishes of those who remain unaffected, but admits that it will ultimately seek to assimilate them when it learns how to do so. Carol is adamantly against their efforts as she searches for a way to reverse the Joining.

== Cast and characters ==
=== Main ===
- Rhea Seehorn as Carol Sturka, an American romantasy author who is immune to the Joining and seeks to reverse it
- Karolina Wydra as Zosia, a Polish member of the Others who acts as Carol's chaperone
- Carlos-Manuel Vesga as Manousos Oviedo, a Colombian immune individual living in Paraguay who refuses all contact with the Others
- Samba Schutte as Koumba Diabaté (season 2; recurring season 1), a Mauritanian immune individual who lives a hedonistic lifestyle in the aftermath of the outbreak

=== Recurring ===
- Miriam Shor as Helen L. Umstead, Carol's manager and wife
- Menik Gooneratne as Laxmi, an Indian immune individual who is hostile to Carol
- Darinka Arones as Kusimayu, an immune Peruvian villager amenable to joining the Others

== Episodes ==
No.	Title	Directed by	Written by	Original release date
1	"We Is Us"	Vince Gilligan	Vince Gilligan	November 7, 2025
Astronomers detect a radio signal from space that spells out a viral RNA sequence. Researchers reproduce the sequence in lab rats, but an outbreak occurs when one of them is bitten. Those infected begin working collectively to spread the virus. Meanwhile, romantasy author Carol Sturka returns to Albuquerque with her manager and partner Helen, having completed a book tour. After planes disperse an aerosol over the city, everyone around Carol begins convulsing and collapsing. Helen is gravely injured when she collapses. Carol rushes Helen to a hospital, but finds that the staff and patients there are in the same condition, and Helen dies. Suddenly, the convulsions pass and the infected begin addressing Carol by name. Carol flees to her home, taking Helen's body with her, and discovers a TV broadcast from the White House press room inviting her by name to phone in. When she calls, the man in the press room explains that the virus has transformed humanity into a permanently happy and peaceful hive mind. He tells Carol that she and eleven others appear to be immune, but that the hive mind hopes to "fix" this.
2	"Pirate Lady"	Vince Gilligan	Vince Gilligan	November 7, 2025
While burying Helen, Carol is approached by Zosia, a member of the hive mind (the "Others"), who explains that all of the infected share one consciousness, containing each other's memories—including Helen's. When Carol lashes out at her, Zosia convulses. After recovering, Zosia reveals that Carol's anger overwhelmed the hive mind and caused many deaths. Carol demands to see the other English-speaking immunes, of which there are five, and the Others arrange a meeting in Bilbao, Spain. One immune, the hedonistic Koumba Diabaté, arrives aboard Air Force One, where the group assembles. To her dismay, Carol finds that the other immunes are content with the status quo, since the Others cater to their every need and are scrupulously nonviolent (although Zosia admits that over 886 million people died during the initial "Joining"). Enraged, Carol accidentally triggers a second deadly global seizure, prompting the other immunes to abandon her. Koumba tells Carol he plans to travel to Las Vegas with Zosia as a sexual companion, but he requires Carol's permission. Although disgusted, Carol allows it. When she sees Zosia leaving with Koumba, she has a change of heart and rushes to stop their departing plane.
3	"Grenade"	Gordon Smith	Gordon Smith	November 14, 2025
More than seven years before the Joining, Carol and Helen visit an ice hotel, after Carol had her egg cells frozen, where they witness the aurora borealis. In the present, Carol and Zosia fly back to Albuquerque, during which Carol calls Manousos, one of the immune, but he curses at her. Zosia provides Carol with a gift that Helen had ordered before the Joining; Carol demands the hive mind completely forget about Helen. Carol refuses a meal prepared by the Others and instead goes grocery shopping, finding her local store empty because of the Others' allocation of resources. At Carol's request, the store is immediately restocked. Angered by a forced power outage, Carol sarcastically asks for a hand grenade. Later, Zosia brings a grenade to Carol's home. Over drinks, Carol vents her frustrations and primes the grenade, thinking it is fake, but is shocked to learn it is real. Zosia quickly throws it away, but is injured in the explosion and taken to a hospital. While waiting for Zosia to recover, Carol speaks to a representative of the hive mind, asking if they would give her anything, even an atom bomb. When the hive mind confirms that they would, Carol dismisses the representative as she contemplates.
4	"Please, Carol"	Zetna Fuentes	Alison Tatlock	November 21, 2025
In a flashback, Manousos, living in a storage facility office in Paraguay, refuses help from the Others. He ransacks the lockers for food when he receives Carol's call. In the present, Carol returns home from the hospital and starts to compile a list of facts she has learned about the Others, determining they cannot lie. Carol goes to Zosia at the hospital to ask if the Joining is reversible, but the hive mind refuses to answer. Carol secretly takes vials of sodium thiopental and tests its effectiveness as a truth serum at home, revealing to herself that she is sexually attracted to Zosia. Back at the hospital, Carol takes Zosia for a walk outside the hospital, stealthily injecting the serum into her IV bag. When Zosia starts to lose clarity, Carol tries to probe the answer from her about reversing the Joining. Zosia struggles to speak, while several Others arrive to surround them, repeatedly chanting "Please, Carol". Zosia collapses from cardiac arrest, with members of the hive mind coming in to try to revive her.
5	"Got Milk"	Gordon Smith	Ariel Levine	November 26, 2025
After Zosia is returned to the hospital, Laxmi, one of the immune, calls Carol and berates her for disrupting the Others. Carol naps, during which the entire Albuquerque population departs, leaving a recorded message telling Carol they need space from her. She records a video message to the other twelve immune, explaining what she's learned and asking for their help. In trying to prevent wolves from digging in her garbage, she takes her trash to town and discovers a large number of empty milk cartons from a local dairy. She investigates and finds that, instead of milk, the dairy was producing a strange fluid created from a bagged crystalline substance. Carol performs tests on the bagged substance, recording her observations in a video for the immune. She postulates the Others drink it to maintain the hive mind. The wolves return for more food and attempt to dig up Helen's body. Carol scares them away with her police car and lays heavy tiles over the grave to protect it. After finding a barcode on the bag, she traces its origin to a local food packaging plant and discovers something shocking hidden under a tarp.
6	"HDP"	Gandja Monteiro	Vera Blasi	December 5, 2025
Carol records her discovery from the packaging warehouse, which is filled with hundreds of shrink-wrapped human body parts. She drives to Las Vegas, where Koumba is living in the penthouse of the Westgate, causing the Others to leave the city. When Carol arrives, Koumba reveals he is already aware of her findings. He shows her a recording that explains that the Others cannot kill any animal or plant; hence, to sustain their bodies, they supplement their diet with human-derived protein (HDP) from dead bodies. Koumba also reveals that he and most of the immune stay in touch over video calls from which Carol is excluded due to a majority vote, which devastates her. The next morning, Koumba reveals the Others have learned how to convert the immune by extracting their stem cells and customizing the virus for each individual – but they require the person's consent to do so. Carol calls the Others to firmly refuse consent before leaving. Three days prior, Manousos receives the first of Carol's video messages and realizes he is not alone. Taking Carol's address from the package, he gets in his car and drives away.
7	"The Gap"	Adam Bernstein	Jenn Carroll	December 12, 2025
Carol returns to Albuquerque and exploits luxuries abandoned by, or requested from, the hive mind as they continue to avoid her. Manousos ventures across South America alone, running low on fuel, food and water, but refusing help from the Others. He practices English by listening to language lesson tapes along the way. When he reaches the Darién Gap, the Others warn him of dangerous conditions and urge him not to continue his journey on foot, offering to transport him and his car directly to Carol. In response, Manousos defiantly burns his car and tells the Others that he will never accept their help because everything they could offer him is stolen. During his trek through the jungle, Manousos trips and is impaled on a chunga palm tree. Despite attempts to cauterize his wounds, he collapses and is rescued by the Others. Having spent over a month in isolation, Carol succumbs to depression. She paints a message on the street asking the Others to come back to her, leading to Zosia's arrival at her home. Carol tearfully embraces her.
8	"Charm Offensive"	Melissa Bernstein	Jonny Gomez	December 19, 2025
Manousos wakes up in a Panamanian hospital, being treated for his injuries. Despite the Others' caution that he still needs time to recover, he forcefully demands to leave and drives away in an ambulance. In Albuquerque, Carol spends the day with Zosia as the Others return to the city. Zosia shows Carol how they sleep in groups inside big spaces, and Carol stays with the Others overnight. The two spend more time together the next day, and Zosia tells Carol about the alien signal's origin and the Others' plan to build a giant antenna to transmit the signal to other planets. Later, they visit a diner with connections to Carol's writing career which was rebuilt from scratch by the Others. That night, Carol explains that the situation with the Others is unsustainable, and she knows the hive mind is attempting to distract her from pursuing a solution. Zosia kisses Carol and they sleep together. The next morning, Carol produces the first chapter of the next book in her Winds of Wycaro series. Several days later, Zosia informs Carol she is about to have a visitor as Manousos nears the Mexico–U.S. border.
9	"La Chica o El Mundo" (Note: transl. 'The Girl or the World')	Gordon Smith	Alison Tatlock & Gordon Smith	December 24, 2025
Manousos arrives at Carol's home. Carol uses a translator app to communicate with him, and he reveals his intent to destroy the Others if the Joining cannot be reversed. Manousos searches Carol's home for listening devices. Carol brings him to stay at one of her neighbor's homes. After seeing Carol call Zosia, Manousos asks the Others to send Zosia to talk to him privately. Carol takes her away, but Manousos calls for another member of the Others to replace Zosia. Zosia suddenly goes into convulsions and Carol finds that Manousos has intentionally triggered a global seizure to test the radio frequency he discovered. Carol stops him, and Zosia and the Others leave the city to protect themselves from Manousos. Carol leaves with Zosia, and they tour the world together for two weeks. During this time, Kusimayu, an immune teenager in rural Peru, willingly joins the Others, proving the customized virus works. Zosia reveals Kusimayu's fate to Carol and confesses that the Others are working to extract Carol's stem cells from her frozen eggs, expecting to complete her custom virus in about a month. Carol has Zosia return her home with a large crate containing an atom bomb and tells Manousos that she is ready to help him.

== Production ==
=== Development ===
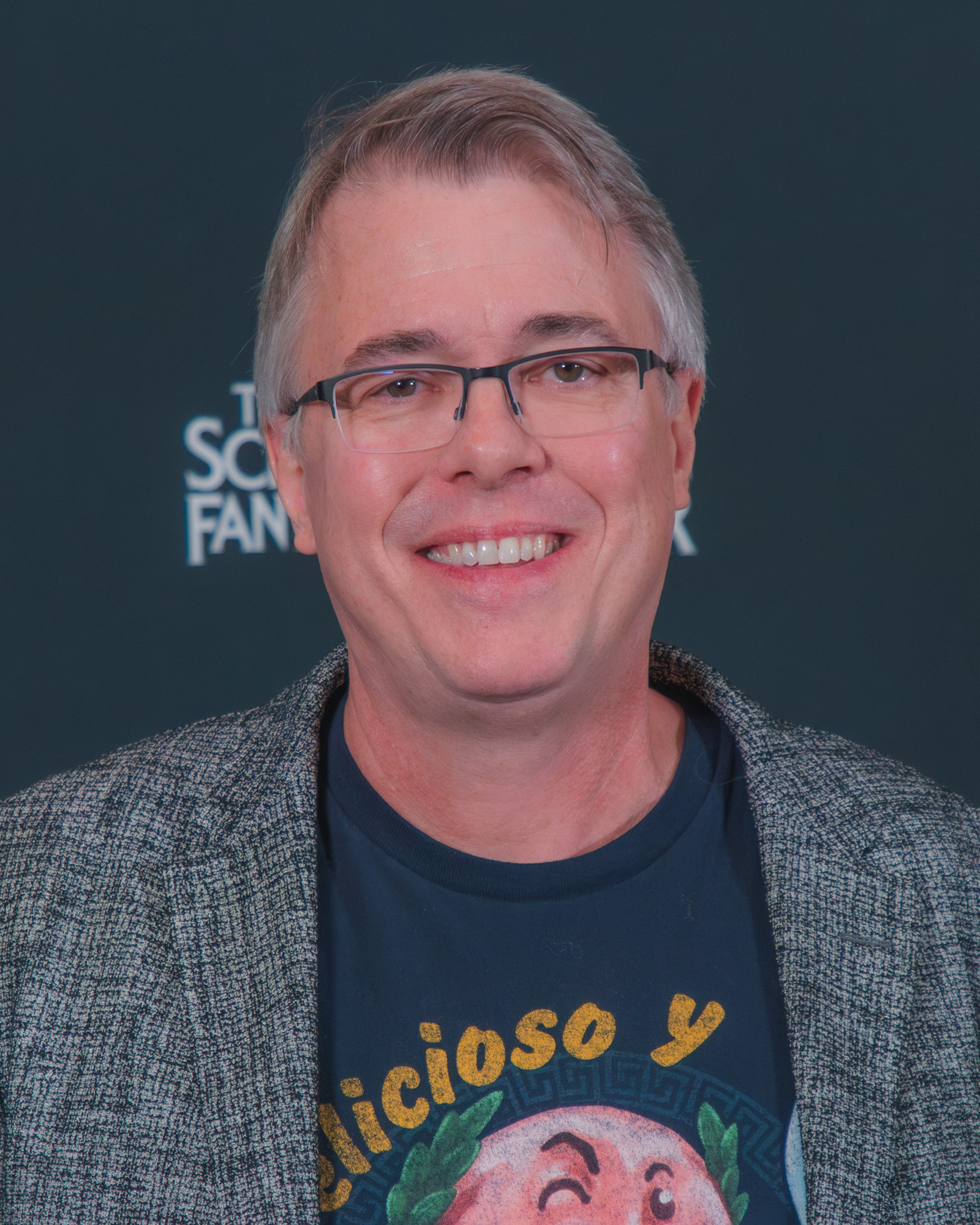
Series creator Vince Gilligan

Vince Gilligan conceived the premise of the series after becoming "weary of writing bad guys", following a decade of working on Breaking Bad and Better Call Saul. During production of Better Call Saul, he came up with the premise of a man who everyone in the world suddenly adored after some cataclysmic event. He expanded on the idea, turning the lead into a female character that was written with Better Call Saul star Rhea Seehorn in mind, and coming up with the idea of a hive mind. As he wanted the story as grounded as possible, he came up with the idea of the hive mind coming from a signal sent from space containing code for RNA that would transform humanity. Gilligan crafted Seehorn's character to be a "flawed good guy" who tries to save the world.

Gilligan told Seehorn that he was working on something he wrote for her, and she immediately agreed to be a part of it even before seeing the initial drafts. After Better Call Saul ended in August 2022, Gilligan pitched a new series that he would develop with Sony Pictures Television. His pitch triggered the first bidding war for one of his works, with Apple TV winning the rights to the series in September 2022 and giving it a two-season order. Gilligan was named as showrunner and executive producer. Seehorn was cast as Carol Sturka, a successful but discontented romance novel author. Gilligan said he felt that he had about four seasons' worth of ideas for Pluribus, and did not envision that there would be a demand for more beyond that, nor would he have the energy to pursue more, given how long each episode takes to produce.

In March 2024, Karolina Wydra was cast in the lead role of Zosia, one of the "Others" that serves as Carol's liaison. The series title was chosen from a list of over 100 names as "a tip of the hat to the unofficial motto of America", E pluribus unum, a Latin phrase meaning "out of many, one".

=== Writing and filming ===
Promotional poster for season 1

In October 2023, after writing for the first season was interrupted by the 2023 Writers Guild of America strike, Gilligan and the writers' room regrouped to finish the last two episodes. The strike also pushed back the plans to begin shooting, possibly into the early part of 2024, in Albuquerque, New Mexico. The strike also affected some cast and crew decisions that were made before the strike; Gordon Smith, an executive producer and screenwriter for Pluribus, had to step in to direct at least one episode due to scheduling conflicts with their original planned director. Filming ran from February to September 2024, taking place in Albuquerque under the working title of Wycaro 339. Each episode had a reported $15 million budget.

In contrast to Breaking Bad or Better Call Saul, the long-term story of Pluribus has been planned out farther in advance with more time to develop the series. This allowed them to avoid mistakes that had been made in the earlier shows, such as the inclusion of the machine gun in the first episode of the final season of Breaking Bad, "Live Free or Die", which Gilligan did not know how to resolve until a breakthrough was made at the writers' table. In the case of Pluribus, the final episode of the first season included the delivery of an atom bomb to Carol, which the writers know will come into the story over its planned four-season run. Season 1's original ending did not include the atom bomb but was changed based on notes from Apple and Sony executives, which Gilligan states created a "better ending". However, Gilligan said he would be willing to drop these plans should a better idea come along in the future.

The official series title of Pluribus, along with its planned release in November 2025, was announced in July 2025. Denise Pizzini serves as the production designer. Once Gilligan had selected Seehorn for the starring role, he was reluctant to use Albuquerque again for filming, fearing that viewers would conflate Seehorn's role as Carol with her Kim Wexler role from Better Call Saul. However, it proved more effective to use Albuquerque as the setting, given Gilligan's previous work in the city for Breaking Bad and Better Call Saul along with pre-existing soundstages that were used for those shows. He also cited the city's available production talent and the financial incentives offered by the state: "I love shooting in New Mexico...But also, frankly, as a business person, I love this rebate." To avoid confusion with his earlier shows, Gilligan avoided filming at locations that he had previously used.

For exterior shots, Carol's cul-de-sac was temporarily constructed on the West Mesa outside of Albuquerque, including Carol's home exteriors and interiors, six surrounding homes, a park, and roadways. Gilligan and the crew constructed fake residences for Pluribus to avoid drawing tourists to a real Albuquerque residence, as had occurred with the home used as Walter White's residence in Breaking Bad. Smith said this was also to minimize the impact to the people of Albuquerque, as some of the shots they planned around Carol's home would normally require shutting down roads and businesses if they had used existing residences. Additional footage was filmed in Spain, featuring locations such as Oviedo, Bilbao, Gipuzkoa and several places in Gran Canaria and La Palma in the Canary Islands.

Filming for season two began on October 31, 2026, in Albuquerque and is planned to shoot for 225 days.

=== Music ===
Dave Porter, who composed music for Breaking Bad and Better Call Saul, serves as composer for the series. Volume 1 of the soundtrack was released digitally on November 21, 2025, while Volume 2 was released digitally on December 26, 2025, by Milan Records, and is available to stream on all major digital music services. The label had previously released the main title theme as a digital single on November 7, 2025.

== Release ==
After Pluribus was announced, very few details of the series were released publicly, even with the series' full trailer released in late October 2025. It was known to be a science fiction series at the time it was pitched, and Gilligan distanced the series from Breaking Bad and Better Call Saul, in that "the world changes very abruptly in the first episode, and then it is quite different."

An advance invitation-only screening of the series's first two episodes was held in New York City on October 10, 2025. The series held its official premiere event at the Directors Guild of America in Los Angeles on November 4. Entertainment Weekly released an exclusive preview of the series's first four minutes one day before the Apple TV premiere.

Pluribus premiered its first two episodes on November 7, 2025, exclusively on Apple TV. Episodes were promoted as being released on Fridays globally from November 7, but were released in Eastern Time Zones on the preceding Thursday evenings. The fifth episode was released two days early due to the Thanksgiving holiday in the United States and the season finale was also released two days early, due to the Christmas holiday.

== Marketing ==
Various teaser trailers for the series have included the phone number "(202) 808–3981", which when dialed plays the following message:

Call to +1 (202) 808–3981 on 9 October 2025

Hi, Carol.
We're so glad you called.
We can't wait for you to join us.
Dial "zero" and we'll get back to you via text message.

Subsequent text messages included alerts for teaser trailers and an invitation to the October 2025 advance screening event in New York City. The messages, which continued through the series premiere, referred to all recipients as "Carol."

On November 14, 2025, Apple Books released an 11-page "excerpt" from Bloodsong of Wycaro, the fourth book in Carol's Winds of Wycaro book series, which was featured in the series's first episode. The excerpt contained a "Letter from the Author", Chapter 16 of the fictional book, and an "About the Author" biography page.

== Reception ==
=== Critical reception ===
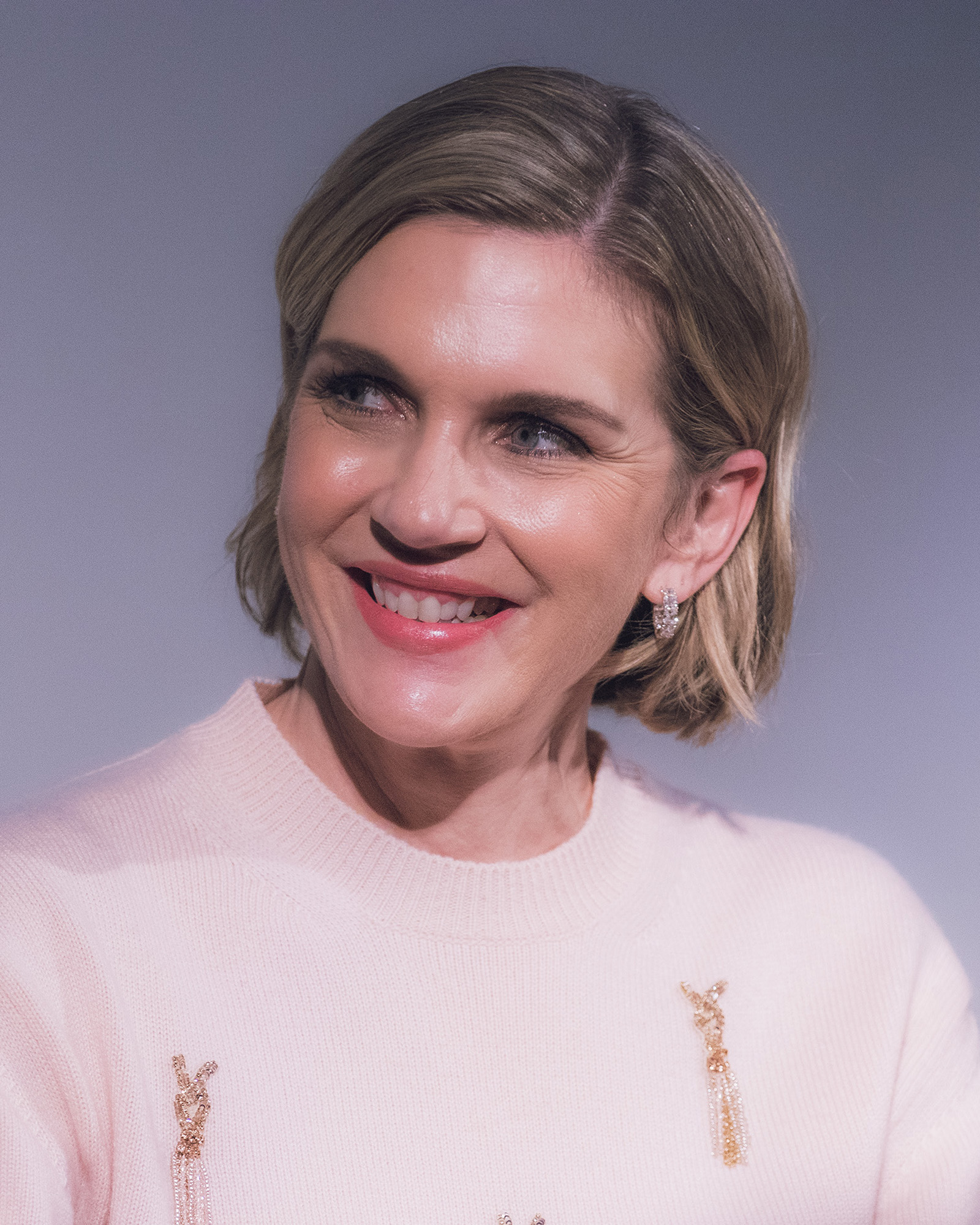
Rhea Seehorn has received critical acclaim for her performance.

The first season of Pluribus received widespread critical acclaim, with critics praising Seehorn's performance, Gilligan's writing and direction, and the series' originality, tone, and stylistic influences. On the review aggregator Rotten Tomatoes, the season holds a 99% approval rating, based on 186 critic reviews, with an average rating of 8.7/10. The website's critics consensus reads: "Genuinely original science-fiction fare from television veteran Vince Gilligan, Pluribus leads Rhea Seehorn through a brave new world with plentiful returns." Metacritic, which uses a weighted average, gave the season a score of 87 out of 100, based on 38 critics, indicating "universal acclaim".

Nicholas Quah of Vulture called the series "an entrancing piece of television", writing that Seehorn's "remarkable" performance "makes it easy to comply with Pluribus's insistence on total presence as it meditates on something essential about humankind." He compared Gilligan's direction to his work on the Breaking Bad franchise for sequences that "luxuriate in depicting process and atmosphere", describing the series' pace as "both thrilling and confounding in its refusal to yield payoff, immediate or otherwise" and praising its "gorgeous" cinematography and production design. Kaiya Shunyata of RogerEbert.com called Pluribus "one of this year's most complicated and thrilling television series", describing the series as a "bewildering mix of science fiction and noir". She praised Seehorn's performance for "commanding" the screen, while describing the "push-and-pull" between her and co-star Wydra as "fascinating to watch".

Linda Holmes of NPR felt Gilligan's "genius" to be in "the deft way he marbles brutality, humanity and humor into a single creation in which each element retains its punch, but the whole still makes sense". She praised the collaboration between Gilligan and the "extraordinary" Seehorn for tapping into the actress's comedic sensibilities, while also praising the series's "crushingly sad" depiction of existential loneliness, as well as its "philosophical frankness", which she found "more refreshing than didactic". Ben Travers of IndieWire gave the show a B+, writing that the series "rewards acute attention and an engaged mind, which would be more than enough reason to recommend it even if it wasn't also a sharply observed celebration of the human condition". He praised the "steady and stunning" cinematography and the "colorful and clarifying" production design, but in contrast to Quah, felt that Gilligan's "devotion to process" as a director "throws off the pacing, which is already unsteady thanks to the general shapelessness of our protagonist's overall journey".

James Poniewozik of The New York Times likened the series to several others, while considering Pluribus to be "its own mystifying thing" and "a wildly fanciful series that feels unsettlingly real at its core". He praised Gilligan as "a master of disorientation" and called Seehorn's performance "enormous, in quality and quantity". Summarizing the first season's pacing, Variety critic Alison Herman wrote, "Pluribus may be slow, but it was never boring." The scholar Hollis Robbins examined the influence of tracking shots used and cited Jacques Lacan in a reading of the show's focus on language.

In contrast, negative reviews focused on the show's slow pace and underdeveloped ideas. Erik Kain of Forbes expressed that his "frustration with Pluribus stems largely from two major problems. First, the pacing and repetitiveness. Second, the stretched-thin plot. This show's story is like too little butter spread over too much bread." Nick Hilton of The Independent concluded that "Where Pluribus could be an authorial send-up of modern America – a compelling vision of trying to stay sane in destabilizing times – it ends up being a bit listless." James Delingpole of The Spectator found that "most of the time it's too busy being ponderous, dry, uncertain of tone (the black comedy isn't funny enough; the dark bits aren't dark enough; the moral message is incomprehensible) and hinting at depths it resolutely fails to fathom." Hannah Brown of The Jerusalem Post found Pluribus "incredibly slow-paced, with awkward dialogue that makes its points over and over." Inkoo Kang of The New Yorker found that "the A.I. analogy gives way to something much less satisfying: a horror story about what their version of living in harmony would really entail."

=== Viewership ===
According to Apple TV, the first two episodes of Pluribus broke its viewership record for a drama series launch, surpassing the premiere of the second season of Severance. For the week ending on November 16, 2025, Pluribus was the most-streamed original series in the United States. Prior to the season finale, Apple TV announced that Pluribus had become its most watched series in platform history, surpassing both Severance and Ted Lasso.

=== Accolades ===
Year (Note: The listed year refers to the date of the ceremony, not necessarily the year in which the corresponding season or episode aired.)	Award	Category	Recipient(s)	Result	Ref.
2025	American Film Institute Awards	Television Program of the Year	Pluribus	Won (Note: This award does not have a single winner, but recognizes multiple programs.)	
2025	Astra Creative Arts Awards	Best Cinematography	Marshall Adams and Paul Donachie	Nominated	
2025	Astra Creative Arts Awards	Best Editing	Skip Macdonald, Chris McCaleb, and Joey Liew	Nominated	
2025	Astra Creative Arts Awards	Best Main Title Design	Joey Reinisch	Nominated	
2025	Astra Creative Arts Awards	Best Production Design	Denise Pizzini	Nominated	
2025	Screen Awards	Best TV Series	Pluribus	Nominated	
2025	Screen Awards	Best Lead Performance by an Actress – TV	Rhea Seehorn	Won	
2025	Screen Awards	Best New TV Series Debut	Pluribus	Nominated	
2026	Critics' Choice Awards	Best Drama Series	Pluribus	Nominated	
2026	Critics' Choice Awards	Best Actress in a Drama Series	Rhea Seehorn	Won	
2026	Golden Globe Awards	Best Television Series – Drama	Pluribus	Nominated	
2026	Golden Globe Awards	Best Performance by an Actress in a Television Series – Drama	Rhea Seehorn	Won	
2026	Society of Composers & Lyricists Awards	Outstanding Original Score for a Television Production	Dave Porter	Nominated	
2026	Society of Composers & Lyricists Awards	Outstanding Original Title Sequence for a Television Production	Dave Porter	Nominated	
2026	ACE Eddie Awards	Best Edited Drama Series	Skip Macdonald (for "We Is Us")	Nominated	
2026	ADG Excellence in Production Design Awards	Excellence in Production Design for a One-Hour Contemporary Single-Camera Series	Denise Pizzini (Note: Additional nominees: Din Danielsen (supervising art director); Chet Maxwell (art director); Julian Scalia (assistant art director); Tom Wagman and Jimmy Hendrix (set designers); Ashley Michelle Marsh (set decorator)) (for "Grenade")	Nominated	
2026	Producers Guild of America Awards	Outstanding Producer of Episodic Television – Drama	Vince Gilligan, Jeff Frost, Gordon Smith, Alison Tatlock, Diane Mercer, Allyce Ozarski, Jenn Carroll, Trina Siopy, Chris Smirnoff, and Julie Hartley	Nominated	
2026	Actor Awards	Outstanding Performance by a Female Actor in a Drama Series	Rhea Seehorn	Nominated	
2026	GLAAD Media Awards	Outstanding New TV Series	Pluribus	Nominated	
2026	Cinema Audio Society Awards	Outstanding Achievement in Sound Mixing for Television Series – One Hour	Phillip W. Palmer, Larry Benjamin, Tim Hoogenakker, Judah Getz, Jamison Rabbe, and Ron Mellegers (for "We Is Us")	Nominated	
2026	Golden Reel Awards	Outstanding Achievement in Sound Editing – Broadcast Long Form Effects / Foley	Nick Forshager, Todd Toon, Jeff Cranford, Jason Charbonnaeu, and Stefan Fraticelli (for "Pirate Lady")	Nominated	
2026	Saturn Awards	Best New Genre Television Series	Pluribus	Won	
2026	Saturn Awards	Best Actress in a Television Series	Rhea Seehorn	Won	
2026	Saturn Awards	Best Supporting Actress in a Television Series	Karolina Wydra	Won	
2026	Saturn Awards	Best Guest Star in a Television Series	Samba Schutte	Nominated	
2026	Writers Guild of America Awards	Television: Drama Series	Vince Gilligan, Gordon Smith, Alison Tatlock, Ariel Levine, Vera Blasi, Jenn Carroll, Jonny Gomez, and Peter Gould	Nominated	
2026	Writers Guild of America Awards	Television: New Series	Vince Gilligan, Gordon Smith, Alison Tatlock, Ariel Levine, Vera Blasi, Jenn Carroll, Jonny Gomez, and Peter Gould	Nominated	
2026	Writers Guild of America Awards	Television: Episodic Drama	Jonny Gomez (for "Charm Offensive")	Nominated	
2026	Writers Guild of America Awards	Television: Episodic Drama	Ariel Levine (for "Got Milk")	Nominated	
2026	Queerties Awards	Best TV Drama	Pluribus	Nominated	
2026	Satellite Awards	Best Drama Series	Pluribus	Won	
2026	Satellite Awards	Best Actress in a Drama or Genre Series	Rhea Seehorn	Won	
2026	Peabody Awards	Entertainment	Pluribus (Note: Presented to Sony Pictures Television in association with Apple)	Honored	
2026	British Academy Television Awards	Best International Programme	Pluribus	Nominated	
2026	Golden Trailer Awards	Most Original (Trailer/Teaser) – TV/Streaming Series	"Message" (Apple TV / Zealot)	Won	
2026	Golden Trailer Awards	Most Original (Trailer/Teaser) – TV/Streaming Series	Teaser "Join Us" (Apple TV / X/AV)	Nominated	
2026	Golden Trailer Awards	Best BTS/EPK for a TV/Streaming Series (over 2 minutes)	"From Every Angle" (Apple TV / The Grossmyth Company)	Nominated	
2026	Golden Trailer Awards	Best BTS/EPK for a TV/Streaming Series (under 2 minutes)	"What on Earth is Pluribus?" (Apple TV / The Grossmyth Company)	Nominated	
2026	Golden Trailer Awards	Best Documentary/Reality Poster (for a TV/Streaming Series)	Pluribus (Apple / GrandSon)	Nominated	
2026	Gotham TV Awards	Breakthrough Drama Series	Pluribus	Won	
2026	Gotham TV Awards	Outstanding Lead Performance in a Drama Series	Rhea Seehorn	Nominated	
2026	Gotham TV Awards	Outstanding Supporting Performance in a Drama Series	Karolina Wydra	Nominated	
2026	IndieWire Honors	Performance Award	Rhea Seehorn	Honored	
2026	Critics' Choice Super Awards	Best Science Fiction / Fantasy Series, Limited Series, or Made-for-TV Movie	Pluribus	Won	
2026	Critics' Choice Super Awards	Best Actress in a Science Fiction / Fantasy Series, Limited Series, or Made-for-TV Movie	Rhea Seehorn	Won	
2026	Set Decorators Society of America TV Awards	Best Achievement in Décor/Design of a One Hour Contemporary Series	Ashley Michelle Marsh and Denise Pizzini	Nominated	
2026	Astra TV Awards	Best Drama Series	Pluribus	Nominated	
2026	Astra TV Awards	Best Actress in a Drama Series	Rhea Seehorn	Nominated	
2026	Astra TV Awards	Best Directing in a Drama Series	Vince Gilligan (for "We Is Us")	Nominated	
2026	Astra TV Awards	Best Writing in a Drama Series	Vince Gilligan (for "We Is Us")	Won	
2026	Astra TV Awards	Best Streaming Drama Ensemble	Pluribus	Nominated	
2026	Astra TV Awards	Best Guest Actress in a Drama Series	Miriam Shor	Nominated	
2026	Dorian TV Awards	Best TV Drama	Pluribus	Nominated	
2026	Dorian TV Awards	Best TV Performance – Drama	Rhea Seehorn	Won	
2026	Dorian TV Awards	Best Supporting TV Performance – Drama	Karolina Wydra	Nominated	
2026	Dorian TV Awards	Best Genre TV Show	Pluribus	Nominated	
2026	Dorian TV Awards	Best Written TV Show	Pluribus	Nominated	
2026	Dorian TV Awards	Best LGBTQ TV Show	Pluribus	Nominated	
2026	Dorian TV Awards	Most Visually Striking Show	Pluribus	Won (Note: Tied with Alien: Earth)	
2026	TCA Awards	Program of the Year	Pluribus	Nominated	
2026	TCA Awards	Outstanding Achievement in Drama	Pluribus	Nominated	
2026	TCA Awards	Outstanding New Program	Pluribus	Nominated	
2026	TCA Awards	Individual Achievement in Drama	Rhea Seehorn	Won	
2026	Imagen Awards	Best Drama Series	Pluribus	Nominated	
2026	Imagen Awards	Best Supporting Actor – Drama	Carlos-Manuel Vesga	Nominated	
2026	Location Managers Guild International Awards	Outstanding Locations in a Contemporary Television Series	Christian Diaz de Bedoya, John O'Connor, Priscila Calero, Jorge Noguerales, Yanira de Armas, and Will Brewster	Won	
2026	Hugo Awards	Best Dramatic Presentation – Short Form	Vince Gilligan (for "We Is Us")	Nominated	
2026	Primetime Creative Arts Emmy Awards	Outstanding Guest Actor in a Drama Series	Jeff Hiller (for "Please, Carol")	Nominated	
2026	Primetime Creative Arts Emmy Awards	Outstanding Guest Actress in a Drama Series	Miriam Shor (for "We Is Us")	Nominated	
2026	Primetime Creative Arts Emmy Awards	Outstanding Casting for a Drama Series	Sharon Bialy, Sherry Thomas, Russell Scott, and Marie A.K. McMaster	Nominated	
2026	Primetime Creative Arts Emmy Awards	Outstanding Cinematography for a Series (One Hour)	Marshall Adams (for "We Is Us")	Nominated	
2026	Primetime Creative Arts Emmy Awards	Outstanding Music Composition for a Series (Original Dramatic Score)	Dave Porter (for "We Is Us")	Nominated	
2026	Primetime Creative Arts Emmy Awards	Outstanding Music Supervision	Thomas Golubić (for "We Is Us")	Nominated	
2026	Primetime Creative Arts Emmy Awards	Outstanding Original Main Title Theme Music	Dave Porter	Won	
2026	Primetime Creative Arts Emmy Awards	Outstanding Picture Editing for a Drama Series	Skip Macdonald (for "We Is Us")	Won	
2026	Primetime Creative Arts Emmy Awards	Outstanding Picture Editing for a Drama Series	Chris McCaleb (for "Grenade")	Nominated	
2026	Primetime Creative Arts Emmy Awards	Outstanding Picture Editing for a Drama Series	Joey Liew (for "Got Milk")	Nominated	
2026	Primetime Creative Arts Emmy Awards	Outstanding Production Design for a Narrative Contemporary Program (One Hour or More)	Denise Pizzini, Dins Danielsen, and Ashley Michelle Marsh (for "Grenade")	Won	
2026	Primetime Creative Arts Emmy Awards	Outstanding Sound Mixing for a Comedy or Drama Series (One Hour)	Larry Benjamin, Tim Hoogenakker, Phillip W. Palmer, Dave Porter, Ron Mellegers, and Judah Getz (for "We Is Us")	Won	
2026	MacGuffin Awards	One Hour Contemporary Television Series	Mark C. Hansen	Nominated	
2026	Primetime Emmy Awards	Outstanding Drama Series	Pluribus (Note: Nominees: Vince Gilligan, Jeff Frost, Gordon Smith, Alison Tatlock, Diane Mercer, Jenn Carroll, Trina Siopy, Chris Smirnoff, and Julie Hartley)	Nominated	
2026	Primetime Emmy Awards	Outstanding Lead Actress in a Drama Series	Rhea Seehorn (for "We Is Us")	Won	
2026	Primetime Emmy Awards	Outstanding Supporting Actor in a Drama Series	Carlos-Manuel Vesga (for "The Gap")	Nominated	
2026	Primetime Emmy Awards	Outstanding Supporting Actress in a Drama Series	Karolina Wydra (for "Charm Offensive")	Nominated	
2026	Primetime Emmy Awards	Outstanding Directing for a Drama Series	Vince Gilligan (for "We Is Us")	Nominated	
2026	Primetime Emmy Awards	Outstanding Writing for a Drama Series	Vince Gilligan (for "We Is Us")	Won	
2026	Seoul International Drama Awards	Best Miniseries	Pluribus	Won	
2026	Seoul International Drama Awards	Best Actress	Rhea Seehorn	Nominated	
2026	Seoul International Drama Awards	Best Director	Vince Gilligan and Gordon Smith	Won	
2026	Seoul International Drama Awards	Best Screenwriter	Vince Gilligan	Nominated	
2026	World Soundtrack Awards	Television Composer of the Year	Dave Porter	Nominated	
2026	Hollywood Music in Media Awards	Best Original Score – TV Show/Limited Series	Dave Porter	Nominated	
2026	Hollywood Music in Media Awards	Best Main Title Theme – TV Show/Limited Series	Dave Porter	Won	

== Themes and stylistic influences ==
While developing the series, Gilligan incorporated tropes from many works in the science fiction genre, taking inspiration from the anthology television series The Twilight Zone and the 1956 film Invasion of the Body Snatchers in depicting the assimilated humans. Gilligan stated that he and his writing staff "actively tried to subvert" genre conventions.

Several critics noted the series' stylistic influences and philosophical commentary. Sean T. Collins of Decider noted influences from several science fiction and horror works in the series premiere, including Invasion of the Body Snatchers, Night of the Living Dead, and 28 Days Later. He also described the series as "a big-budget reimagining" of The Prisoner. James Poniewozik compared the series to The Leftovers, The Twilight Zone, and The Last Man on Earth. He noted that Gilligan, who was a writer on The X-Files and one of the showrunners of its spin-off The Lone Gunmen, returned to many of the themes from that universe. Pluribus was also compared to another Apple TV show, Severance, as both are complex sci-fi mysteries that deal with "transforming human consciousness". Michael Ahr of Den of Geek proposed that Pluribus took the concept and consequences of a hive mind takeover further than other science fiction media such as Star Trek and The Expanse.

Some critics found the story to be relevant to the topical subject of artificial intelligence. Poniewozik found parallels between the show's premise and "the modern lure of AI, which promises to deliver progress and plenty for the low, low price of smooshing all human intelligence into one obsequious collective mind". Josh Rosenberg of Esquire also interpreted Pluribus as an allegory for humanity's "bizarre acceptance" of artificial intelligence, writing that "for once, we're watching a meaningful story about our connection to AI that isn't solely about choosing whether to fall in love with it or kill it". Gilligan has noted his own disdain for AI, and an anti-AI disclaimer in the end credits of Pluribus states that "this show was made by humans", though he also pointed out that he was not thinking of AI while writing the series since the story was conceived more than eight years prior.

The series makes a direct comparison between the hive mind's attempts to assimilate the immune and conversion therapy. Parallels have also been drawn between the effects of the alien virus and the COVID-19 pandemic. Kayla Kumari Upadhyaya of Autostraddle noted that the series touched on settler colonialism, stating, "the hive can be seen as representing a very extreme form of assimilation, one in which all cultural differences are replaced with a homogenous monoculture".
