= Rhea Seehorn =

American actress (born 1972)

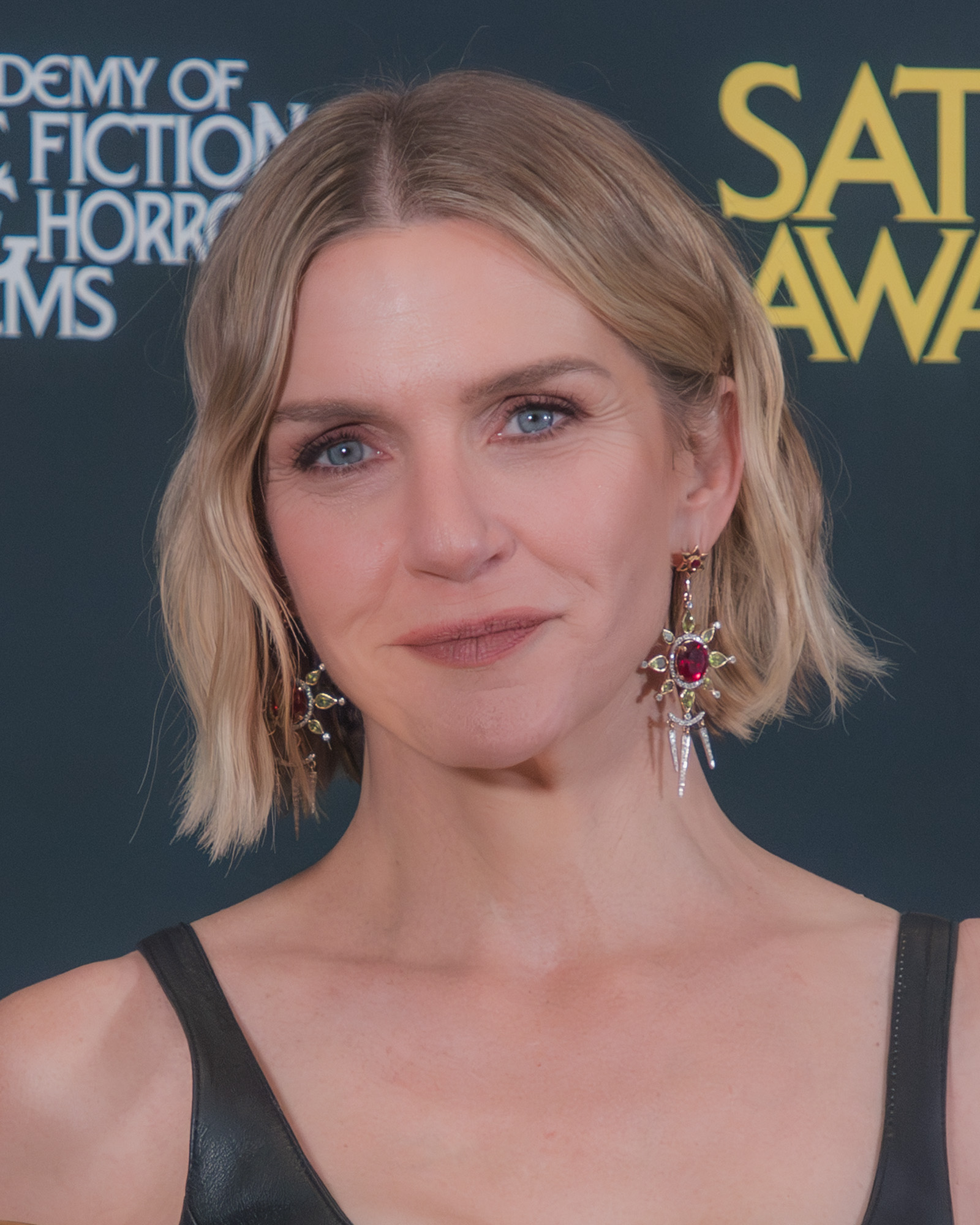
- Seehorn in 2026
- Born: Deborah Rhea Seehorn; May 12, 1972 (age 54); Norfolk, Virginia, U.S.
- Education: George Mason University (BA)
- Occupations: Actress; director
- Years active: 1997–present
- Partner(s): Graham Larson (2013–present; engaged)

Deborah Rhea Seehorn (Note: /reɪ/ RAY) (born May 11, 1972) is an American actress and director. She is best known for playing attorney Kim Wexler in the AMC legal crime drama series Better Call Saul (2015–2022) and novelist Carol Sturka in the Apple TV science fiction thriller series Pluribus (2025–present). Her accolades include a Golden Globe, two TCA Awards, and a Primetime Emmy Award.

Seehorn's performance in Better Call Saul won her a TCA Award for Individual Achievement in Drama, in addition to nominations for two Primetime Emmy Awards for Outstanding Supporting Actress in a Drama Series, and three Critics' Choice Television Awards. For Cooper's Bar (2022–2023), which she also co-created and directed, she was nominated for a Primetime Emmy Award for Outstanding Actress in a Short Form Comedy or Drama Series. For Pluribus, she earned a Primetime Emmy Award for Outstanding Lead Actress in a Drama Series, a Golden Globe Award for Best Actress in a Television Series – Drama, a Critics' Choice Television Award for Best Actress in a Drama Series, and a second TCA Award.

== Early life ==
Deborah Rhea Seehorn was born in Norfolk, Virginia, on May 12, 1972. Her mother was an executive assistant for the U.S. Navy, while her father was a counterintelligence agent in the Naval Investigative Service. She has an older sister. Her family moved frequently during her childhood, living in Washington, D.C. and Arizona, as well as Japan. Her parents divorced when she was a child, and she lived with her mother and sister in Virginia Beach, Virginia. Her father died when she was 18. Following in the footsteps of her father and grandmother, she studied painting, drawing, and architecture from a young age. She continued pursuing the visual arts, but had a growing passion for acting and was introduced to theater while attending George Mason University.

Seehorn has used her middle name Rhea since childhood, due to feeling a "disassociation" with her given name Deborah. She said, "The Deborahs and Debbies that I knew or saw on TV always seemed to be really attractive cheerleaders, and it was not my lane at all in school". She was also bullied for her name and switched to Rhea for "a fresh start".

== Career ==
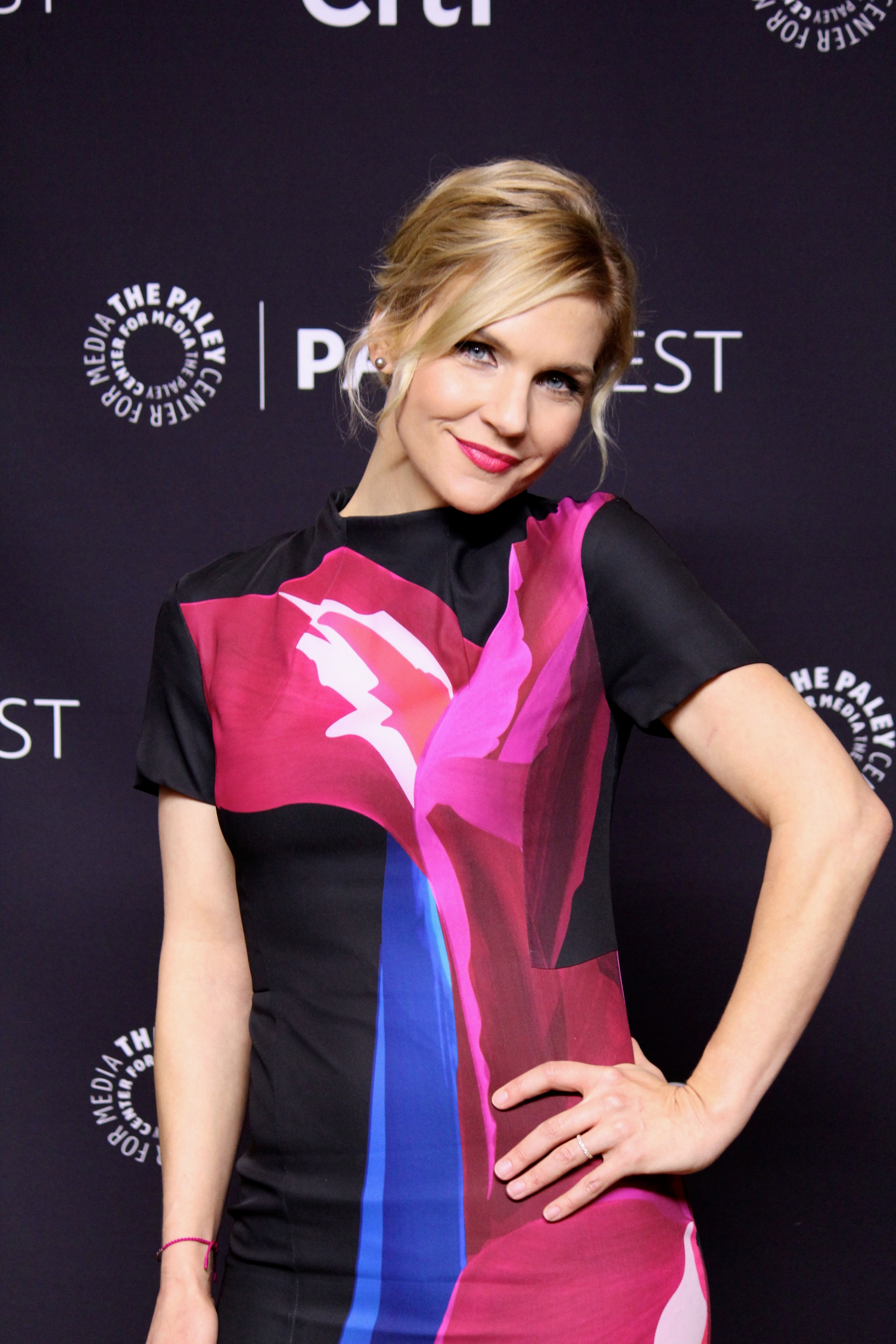
Seehorn in March 2016

While in college, Seehorn was looking to get into theater after the encouragement of her acting teacher, and worked many jobs in the theater industry of Washington, D.C. to try to get noticed. She ended up getting some major roles in local theater productions, but still needed to take odd jobs to make ends meet, as well as taking on roles in various corporate instructional videos.

Seehorn soon started getting parts in more television productions, often playing roles that she considered as "very wry, sarcastic, knowing women" similar to her idol Bea Arthur. However, most of these roles were short-run series cancelled after one or two seasons. Among her early roles was the lead in a pilot for an American version of the Argentine telenovela Lalola entitled Eva Adams, about a womanizing executive who is turned into a woman by witchcraft as revenge for his treatment of women. It was filmed for Fox in 2009 and co-starred James Van Der Beek. The show was envisioned as a dramedy in the vein of the telenovela Yo soy Betty, la fea, which was itself adapted for American audiences as Ugly Betty, but it was ultimately not picked up for a regular series.

Seehorn's film credits include roles in the independent films Riders and Floating and the short films The Pitch, The Gentlemen, and A Case Against Karen. Her theater credits include her Broadway debut as an understudy in the production of 45 Seconds from Broadway, as well as well-received roles in Marat/Sade, Freedomland, How I Learned to Drive, Stop Kiss, All My Sons and The World Over. She was part of the Woolly Mammoth Theatre Company.

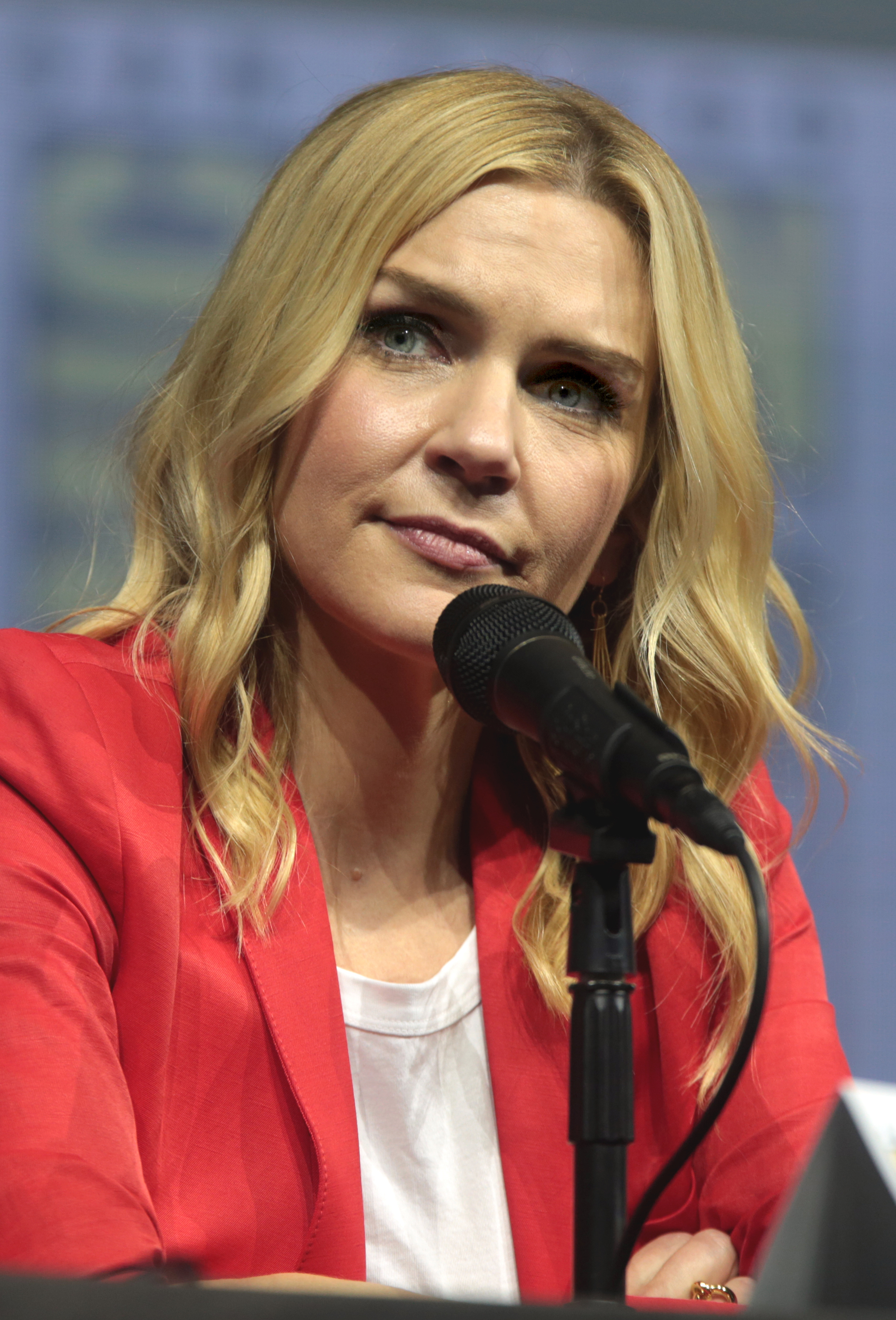
Seehorn in 2018

In May 2014, Seehorn was cast in the Breaking Bad spin-off prequel series Better Call Saul (2015–2022), created by Vince Gilligan and Peter Gould. Seehorn portrays Kim Wexler, a lawyer and the love interest of the titular Jimmy McGill / Saul Goodman (Bob Odenkirk). The series premiered on February 8, 2015. For her role, she has received widespread critical acclaim, winning two Satellite Awards for Best Supporting Actress – Series, Miniseries or Television Film, one Saturn Award for Best Supporting Actress on Television out of two nominations, and one Television Critics Association Award for Individual Achievement in Drama out of three nominations, also receiving two nominations for the Primetime Emmy Award for Outstanding Supporting Actress in a Drama Series and three nominations for the Critics' Choice Television Award for Best Supporting Actress in a Drama Series. TVLine named Seehorn "Performer of the Year" in 2022 for her work on Better Call Saul.

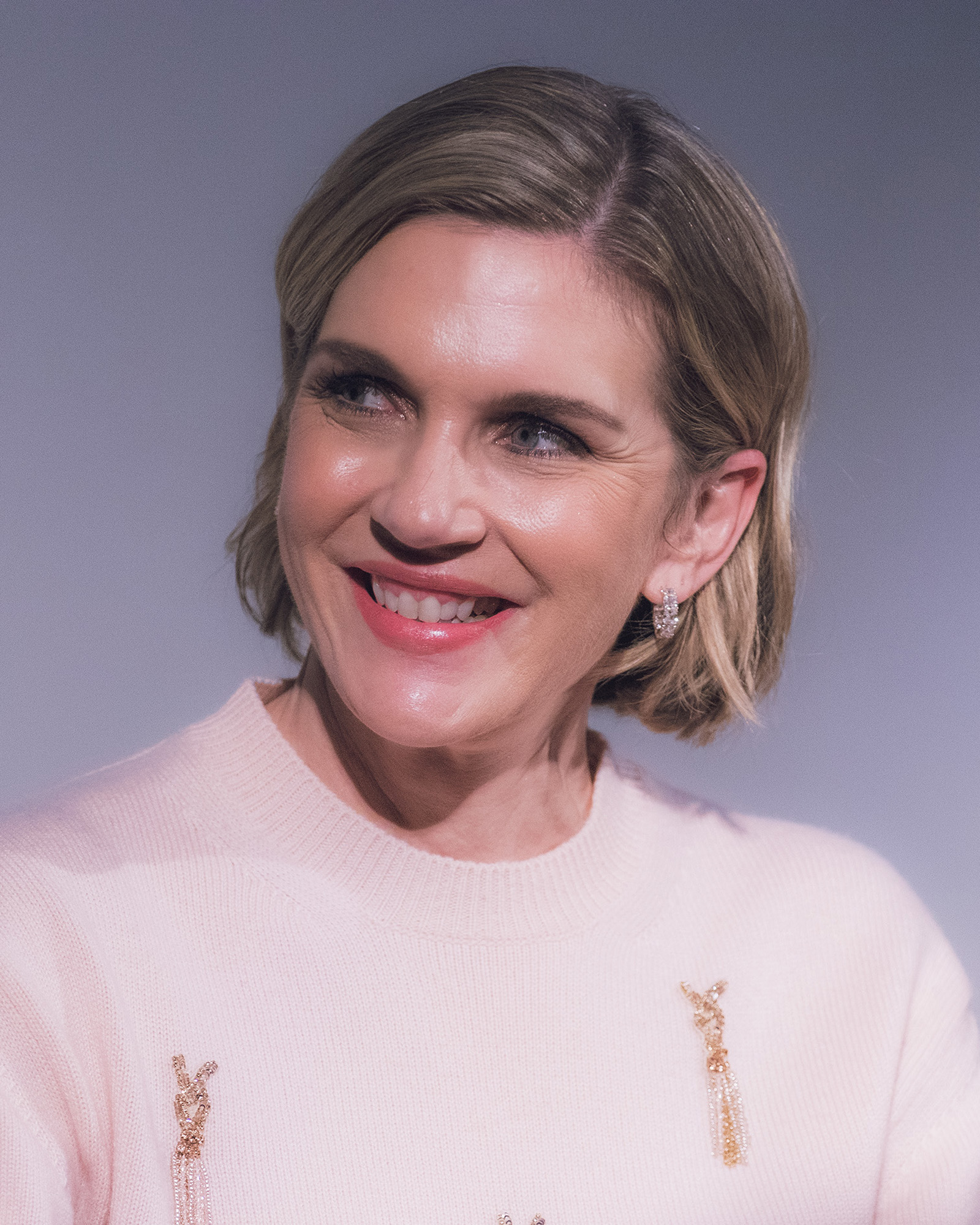
Seehorn in 2025

In 2021, Seehorn starred in the horror-thriller film Things Heard & Seen. In 2022, she made her television directorial debut with the fourth episode of Better Call Saul's final season ("Hit and Run"). That same year, she began appearing in the AMC web series Cooper's Bar, which earned her an additional Emmy nomination for Outstanding Actress in a Short Form Comedy or Drama Series.

Seehorn stars in Pluribus, Gilligan's next series after Better Call Saul, which was picked up by Apple TV+ for a two-season order and premiered on November 7, 2025. Her performance as Carol Sturka, a cynical fantasy romance author who discovers that she is one of 13 people in the world immune to an alien virus that turns the rest of humanity into a hive mind, garnered her a Golden Globe Award for Best Actress in a Television Series – Drama, a Critics' Choice Television Award for Best Actress in a Drama Series and an Emmy for Outstanding Lead Actress in a Drama Series in September 2026.

== Personal life ==
Seehorn was introduced to real estate agent and former film producer Graham Larson by his ex-wife. They have been together since 2013 and engaged since 2015, and live in the Cheviot Hills neighborhood of Los Angeles with his two sons.

During Better Call Saul's principal photography, Seehorn would live with cast members Bob Odenkirk and Patrick Fabian in an Albuquerque house owned by Odenkirk and his wife. Odenkirk mentioned that this was for the actors to keep each other company after filming had finished for the day, as he had lived by himself during the first season and felt a sense of loneliness when he was home. Seehorn stated that the actors and their spouses all knew of and were friends with one another, so all parties were content with the living arrangement.

== Filmography ==
=== Film ===
Year	Title	Role	Notes
2000	Eat Me!	Glynna	
2006	The Shaggy Dog	Lori	
2018	Seven Stages to Achieve Eternal Bliss	Nordheim	
2019	I Hate Kids	Kelly	
2019	Inside Man: Most Wanted	Dr. Brynn Stewart	Direct-to-DVD
2019	Wyrm	Dr. Johnson	
2021	Things Heard & Seen	Justine Sokolov	
2022	Linoleum	Erin Edwin	
2024	Bad Boys: Ride or Die	Judy Howard	
2026	Sender	Whitney	
TBA	Eleven Days †	TBA	Post-production
TBA	Running †	TBA	Filming

=== Television ===
Year	Title	Role	Notes
1997	Homicide: Life on the Street	Jenny	Episode: "All Is Bright"
2003–2004	I'm with Her	Cheri Baldzikowski	22 episodes
2005	Head Cases	Nicole Walker	6 episodes
2005	Romy and Michele: In the Beginning	Ashley Schwartz	Television film
2006	The Singles Table	Stephanie Vogler	Unaired; 6 episodes
2006	Modern Men	Anita	Episode: "Sexual Healing"
2007	The Thick of It	Ollie Todzio	Pilot
2008	The Starter Wife	Charlotte	4 episodes
2009, 2017–2019	American Dad!	Various voices	4 episodes
2009	Trust Me	Brooke	3 episodes
2009	Dollhouse	Jocelyn Bashford	Episode: "Haunted"
2010	Burn Notice	Patty	Episode: "Breach of Faith"
2010	The Closer	Judy Lynn	Episode: "Last Woman Standing"
2011–2013	Whitney	Roxanne Harris	38 episodes
2011–2014	Franklin & Bash	Ellen Swatello	11 episodes
2013	Family Guy	Joanie Cunningham (voice)	Episode: "Save the Clam"
2014	House of Lies	Samantha	2 episodes
2015–2022	Better Call Saul	Kim Wexler	60 episodes Director (Episode: "Hit and Run")
2017	Shut Eye	Charlie's Mother	2 episodes
2018	Law & Order: Special Victims Unit	Martha Cobb	Episode: "Info Wars"
2018	Roseanne	Carrie	Episode: "Eggs Over, Not Easy"
2018	Robot Chicken	Karen / Teenage Girl (voice)	Episode: "Your Mouth Is Hanging off Your Face"
2019	Veep	Michelle York	5 episodes
2019	The Act	Janet	Episode: "A Whole New World"
2019	The Twilight Zone	Martha Miller	Episode: "Not All Men"
2021	Ridley Jones	Ida (voice)	6 episodes
2021	The Harper House	Debbie Harper (voice)	10 episodes
2023–2024	Monster High	Medusa Gorgon (voice)	4 episodes
2023–2024	Invincible	Andressa (voice)	2 episodes
2024	My Adventures with Superman	Lara (voice)	Episode: "Pierce the Heavens, Superman!"
2024	Kite Man: Hell Yeah!	Insect Queen (voice)	2 episodes
2025	Win or Lose	Carole (voice)	Episode: "Coach's Kid"
2025–present	Pluribus	Carol Sturka	Main role
2026	Stick	Amanda	Episode: "Chip Off the Old Butch"

=== Other media ===
Year	Title	Role	Type	Notes
1997	Magic: The Gathering	Tutorial Witch	Video game	
2011	Maria, Me and a Monster	Gwen	Video	
2018	Better Call Saul: Ethics Training with Kim Wexler	Kim Wexler	Web series	AMC.com - 10 episodes
2018	The Thrilling Adventure Hour: Sparks Nevada, Marshal on Mars	Penelope Ophelian	Podcast series	1 episode
2020	Convolution	Sydney Birch	Podcast series	Audible - 3 episodes
2022–2023	Cooper's Bar	Kris Latimer	Web series	Also co-creator, director and executive producer
2022	Better Call Saul: Filmmaker Training	Kim Wexler	Web series	AMC.com - 1 episode
2025	StanLand	Melanie Hughes	Podcast series	Main role

== Awards and nominations ==
=== Primetime Emmy Awards ===
Year	Category	Work	Result
2022	Outstanding Supporting Actress in a Drama Series	Better Call Saul	Nominated
2024	Outstanding Supporting Actress in a Drama Series	Better Call Saul	Nominated
2022	Outstanding Actress in a Short Form Comedy or Drama Series	Cooper's Bar	Nominated
2026	Outstanding Lead Actress in a Drama Series	Pluribus	Won

=== Actor Awards ===
Year	Category	Work	Result
2019	Outstanding Performance by an Ensemble in a Drama Series	Better Call Saul	Nominated
2021	Outstanding Performance by an Ensemble in a Drama Series	Better Call Saul	Nominated
2023	Outstanding Performance by an Ensemble in a Drama Series	Better Call Saul	Nominated
2026	Outstanding Performance by a Female Actor in a Drama Series	Pluribus	Nominated

=== Critics' Choice Television Awards ===
Year	Category	Work	Result
2019	Best Supporting Actress in a Drama Series	Better Call Saul	Nominated
2021	Best Supporting Actress in a Drama Series	Better Call Saul	Nominated
2023	Best Supporting Actress in a Drama Series	Better Call Saul	Nominated
2026	Best Actress in a Drama Series	Pluribus	Won

=== Golden Globe Awards ===
Year	Category	Work	Result
2026	Best Actress in a Television Series – Drama	Pluribus	Won

=== Satellite Awards ===
Year	Category	Work	Result
2015	Best Supporting Actress – Series, Miniseries or Television Film	Better Call Saul	Won
2016	Best Supporting Actress – Series, Miniseries or Television Film	Better Call Saul	Won (Note: The award was tied with Olivia Colman for The Night Manager.)
2023	Best Actress in a Drama or Genre Series	Better Call Saul	Nominated
2026	Best Actress in a Drama or Genre Series	Pluribus	Won

=== Saturn Awards ===
Year	Category	Work	Result
2018	Best Supporting Actress on Television	Better Call Saul	Won
2019	Best Supporting Actress on Television	Better Call Saul	Nominated
2021	Best Actress on Television	Better Call Saul	Nominated
2022	Best Actress on Television	Better Call Saul	Won
2026	Best Actress in a Television Series	Pluribus	Won

=== TCA Awards ===
Year	Category	Work	Result
2020	Individual Achievement in Drama	Better Call Saul	Nominated
2022	Individual Achievement in Drama	Better Call Saul	Nominated
2023	Individual Achievement in Drama	Better Call Saul	Won
2026	Individual Achievement in Drama	Pluribus	Won

== Miscellaneous awards ==
Award	Year	Category	Work	Result
Astra Awards	2024	Best Supporting Actress in a Broadcast Network or Cable Series, Drama	Better Call Saul	Won
Astra TV Awards	2026	Best Actress in a Drama Series	Pluribus	Nominated
Astra TV Awards	2026	Best Streaming Drama Ensemble	Pluribus	Nominated
Critics' Choice Super Awards	2026	Best Actress in a Science Fiction/Fantasy Series	Pluribus	Won
Dorian Awards	2022	Best Supporting TV Performance	Better Call Saul	Nominated
Dorian Awards	2026	Best TV Performance – Drama	Pluribus	Won
Gold Derby TV Awards	2026	Drama Actress	Pluribus	Nominated
Gotham TV Awards	2026	Outstanding Lead Performance in a Drama Series	Pluribus	Nominated
Hollywood Critics Association	2022	Best Supporting Actress in a Broadcast Network or Cable Series, Drama	Better Call Saul	Won
Screen Awards	2025	Best Lead Performance by an Actress – TV	Pluribus	Won
Seoul International Drama Awards	2026	Best Actress	Pluribus	Nominated
Women's Image Network Awards	2020	Actress Drama Series	Better Call Saul	Won

== Notes ==
- The listed year refers to the date of the award ceremony.
- The 2016 Satellite Award was shared with Olivia Colman for The Night Manager.
- The Women's Image Network Awards entry is listed by ceremony year; some award databases identify the edition as 2019.
