= Carol Sturka =

Fictional character from Pluribus

- Pluribus character
- Rhea Seehorn as Carol Sturka
- First appearance: "We Is Us" (2025)
- Created by: Vince Gilligan
- Portrayed by: Rhea Seehorn

In-universe information
- Occupation: Romance novel author
- Spouse: Helen L. Umstead (deceased)
- Home: Albuquerque, New Mexico, United States
- Nationality: American

Carol Sturka is a fictional character and the protagonist of the American post-apocalyptic science fiction television series Pluribus. Created by Vince Gilligan and portrayed by Rhea Seehorn, Carol is a romance author who is one of 13 humans who were immune to an alien virus that turned the rest of humanity into a hive mind. Carol is grieving the death of her wife, Helen, who died from injuries shortly after being infected.

== Appearances ==
Carol Sturka appears as the protagonist in Pluribus and is a resident of Albuquerque, New Mexico. She works as a romance novel author, and is married to a woman named Helen. After a book signing, an alien virus causes nearly every human to become part of a hive mind, including Helen, who dies shortly after joining due to head trauma. She learns that the hive mind wishes her to be happy and is willing to offer her whatever she likes, though seeks to figure out how to turn her due to a biological imperative. She meets various other figures, including a member of the hive mind called Zosia, a fellow normal human named Koumba Diabaté who takes advantage of the situation by living luxuriously, and a man named Manousos Oviedo, who refuses to engage with the hive mind at all and, like Carol, wishes to eliminate the hive mind. She acts adversely to the hive mind, unlike most of the other 12 unaffected humans, at one point comparing the hive mind's desire to turn her to her mother sending her to conversion therapy over her sexuality. Over time, Carol's feelings on the hive mind shifts due in part to her attraction to Zosia and the realization that they couldn't turn her without her consent, but switches after realizing they'd found a way to do so without requiring consent.

== Concept and creation ==
Carol Sturka was created for Pluribus by director Vince Gilligan, and portrayed by Rhea Seehorn. It took time for Seehorn and Gilligan to work on the character together, experiencing difficulty with keeping true to her misery while still having her be the hero of the story. According to Seehorn, most of the guidance Gilligan gave her was that she was a "reluctant hero", whose "behavioral norms" before the events of the show no longer work. Gilligan picked Seehorn for the role after her appearance as Kim Wexler in Better Call Saul, which was co-created by Gilligan. He expressed worry over creating a female protagonist, particularly a lesbian, due to it not being his experience. He stated that he was not writing her with the idea of masculine vs. feminine, and was "just writing this character who’s got a lot of issues and is struggling to find happiness". Seehorn stated that she didn't think Gilligan was setting out to write a "female empowerment" story, and that he created a "fascinating, complex, incredibly reluctant hero with a lot of flaws but a lot of strengths, some of which [Carol] didn't know she had." Discussing Carol's procurement of a nuke, Seehorn states that Carol has a "lot of bottled-up rage", calling it a "flaw and a super power" that she has had to suppress until now. She said that such a choice was the product of her impulsively thinking "What’s the largest, most violent, most insane thing I could do right now in response to what’s been done to me?"

Vince Gilligan chose the first name Carol as an homage to Carol Burnett, whom Gilligan worked with during the sixth season of Better Call Saul. The surname Sturka originated from Will Sturka, the main character in The Twilight Zone episode "Third from the Sun", a personal favorite series of Gilligan's.

Pluribus costume designer Jennifer Bryan stated that, when designing Carol's costume and appearance for the first episode, she studied romance novel authors like Jackie Collins and Barbara Cartland. She aimed to create an outfit that conveyed that she was relatable while still someone they could look up to. She described the design as something that the fans might be able to achieve if they had a little money. She chose a yellow hybrid crop top due to a combination of the action of the first episode as well as wanting her to be able to "pop" during the nighttime scenes.

== Reception ==
The Atlantic writer Maris Kreizman argued that Carol's experience with the hive mind mirrored experiences she had before the plot of Pluribus, stating that the feeling of trying to appease her readers by compromising her vision was similar. She believed that her occupation was an important one for the plot, adding that it was meant to show the importance of critical thinking and making decisions for one's self instead of the collective. She also cited a scene where the hive mind tells her that her book is as good as William Shakespeare's writing, stating that this disgusted her, because Carol values the ability to distinguish things like this. On her character, Kreizman believed that while she may not necessarily be a good person, she has a strong character that values individualism and is willing to try despite her flaws. The New York Times writer Maya Phillips believed that Carol's identity as a mainstream creator who sees herself as superior aligns with her identity as one of the only disconnected humans, stating that she was "truly separate" and that she ironically is one of the only creatives in a world where creativity has no value.

Variety writer Alison Herman discussed similarities and differences between Carol and fellow Rhea Seehorn character Kim Wexler; she felt that they shared the same "wary intelligence", but that Carol was more volatile. Herman felt that Carol's animosity towards the hive mind was similar to the animosity she holds for her fans for enjoying her own work. She praised Seehorn's performance, describing Carol as "funny and pitiful, prickly and vulnerable" and Seehorn's performance as "magnetic". Spitfire News writer Kat Tenbarge found her irritable personality, which she felt contrasted the hive mind, was enjoyable for that contrast. She also discussed online backlash against Carol's character for being "unlikable", arguing that part of why she is viewed as unlikable is because of men who like Walter White, the protagonist of Vince Gilligan's Breaking Bad, as well as male characters with "gruff, angry, outright violent personalities", without seemingly being able to find this kind of enjoyment in fictional women. She found her character "funny, relatable, and more reasonable than a lot of people give her credit for", stating that she doesn't care about being likable while trying to save the world, which made Tenbarge like her more. She quoted Vince Gilligan on this, who did not understand how people could find her unlikable, agreeing that there may be a bias against a female character acting this way.

Carol's sexuality was the subject of critical analysis by critics. Out writer Mey Rude believed that she was the "flawed lesbian hero" that the US needed. She stated that flawed heroes were typically male, appreciating that Carol was a "bitch" and believing that lesbians enjoy having a character who's so rude. Polygon writer Aimee Hart praised Gilligan for how he handled Carol as a lesbian character, stating that while her sexuality isn't the most important trait of her character, it informs how she views the hive mind and its actions. She felt that her misanthropic views made her unlikable at times, but her grief over Helen's death helped make her relatable and sympathetic. Referencing Gilligan's worries about doing Carol justice, she believed it helped make the writer handle Helen's death with "care and close attention". Hart stated that Helen's love was a unique one, and it was now shared with everyone, despite the hive mind lacking the ability to challenge Carol. Time writer Judy Berman believed that both Carol and Kim Wexler were great because neither were defined by gender or sexuality. She felt that Carol was an "imperfect hero", stating that she serves as a role model for people that isn't consumed by anger or grief. Them.us writer Michael Cuby stated that Carol's misanthropy was at least somewhat derived from "deep queer trauma", believing that Carol never recovered from being forced into conversion therapy.
