= OUTeverywhere =

LGBTQ website

- Formation: 1995
- Dissolved: 2019
- Region served: UK
- Members: 200,000 (2006)
- Affiliations: Gay Essex Dining, Manchester Lesbian and Gay Chorus, Age Concern and The House of Homosexual Culture
- Website: www.outeverywhere.com

Standard landing page for the OUT everywhere website.

OUTeverywhere (also known simply as OUT and formerly OUTintheUK) was a website providing an online lesbian, gay, bisexual, and transgender community, chiefly in the UK, although it has members worldwide. The site provided member profiles with picture galleries, private messages, discussion boards (the use of which is restricted to paying customers) and online chat. The community also organised offline events, such as coffee or cocktail outings, sporting events and day trips.

== History ==
The website was created in 1995 after which the membership then increased due to word of mouth in conjunction with a small amount of advertising and PR.

Initially the site was for gay men only. In 2003 OUTforWomen was launched. At first the two sites were run separately. Eventually the sites started to integrate. Initially integration was limited, but eventually a decision was made to allow full integration between the two sites.

In May 2005 the site was relaunched under the OUTeverywhere name. The relaunch involved a major redesign of the website, as well as full integration between male and female members. The relaunch also indicated a change of ethos moving the website from an online community to a real life organisation operating both online and offline. Part of this change in ethos was to be achieved by calling the site "Up and Doing". However, the relaunch eventually proceeded with the name "OUTeverywhere" after complaints from long-standing members though the company trades under the name "Up and Doing Ltd".

The website steers away from an emphasis on sex by not allowing nude profile photos and stopping members openly soliciting for sex. Offline group events are a feature of the community. Previous examples include murder mystery weekends, cheese rolling gatherings, camping trips and bowling.

In October 2017, it was announced that the website would close on 31 October 2018.

The Website finally closed down in December 2019.

== Publicity ==
OUTeverywhere (then called OutInTheUK) achieved publicity when two of its members decided to organise an event to throw sausages at magician David Blaine, whilst he was suspended without food in a perspex box by Tower Bridge.

In 2006, OUT produced a "newsletter" called "ThisIsGay" using postings from its forums to represent the idea that it covered a whole spectrum of interests. However, after objections from members that it had homophobic undertones and a mention of the newsletter in The Daily Star the last newsletter was "pulled" from publication. That year the site contacted 30,000 members who had not taken part in any of their planned social events as part of a programme to address concerns over cyberstalkers.

== See also ==
- Homosocialization
