= 78th Writers Guild of America Awards =

78th WGA Awards
- Date: March 8, 2026
- Organized by: Writers Guild of America East; Writers Guild of America West ceremony was cancelled on March 1

The 78th Writers Guild of America Awards were held on March 8, 2026, to honor the best writing in film, television and radio of 2025. The nominations were announced on January 27, 2026. Roy Wood Jr. returned to host for the New York ceremony at the Edison Ballroom. The 78th Awards took place amid the 2026 Writers Guild Staff Union Strike. The Writers Guild Staff Union represents over 110 employees of the Writers Guild of America West. On March 1, the Los Angeles ceremony was cancelled after the WGSU refused to ratify the WGAW's last best and final offer by February 27. The East ceremony in New York City continued as planned.

== WGAW Ceremony Cancellation ==
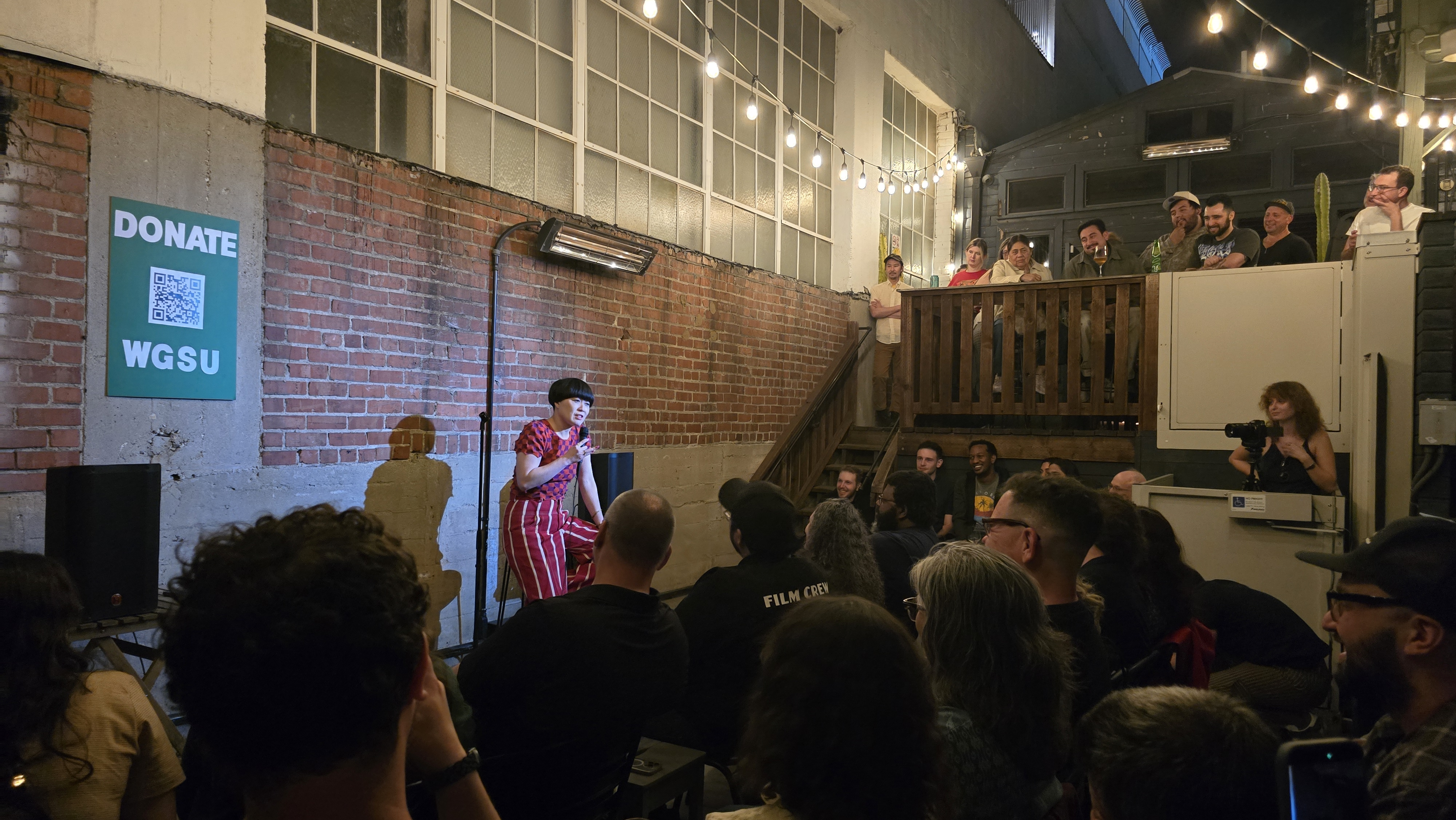
Okatsuka performs jokes intended for the cancelled 78th WGAW Awards for an audience of striking WGSU members and donors on Sunday, March 8, 2026

In February 2026, the staff of the Writers Guild of America West, who have been bargaining with Guild Management over a first union contract, went on an unfair labor practice strike, alleging that the Guild had committed unionbusting and bad faith "surface bargaining". On February 24, Guild Management threatened to shut down the awards show the following month if the Writers Guild Staff Union (WGSU) did not accept their last, best, and final offer by February 27. The staff union refused to entertain the offer, criticizing it for lacking "basic union protections" and for "maintaining status quo". On February 28, the day after the Guild promised to cancel the Awards, they had still not publicly announced a cancellation. The WGSU said they remained ready to continue bargaining with the Guild's management once they returned to the table.

On March 1, Writers Guild of America West (WGAW) cancelled the Los Angeles ceremony planned for March 8. The show was scheduled to take place at the JW Marriott Los Angeles L.A. LIVE and be hosted by comedian and WGAW member Atsuko Okatsuka.

After the awards show cancellation, Okatsuka announced on March 6 that she would be headlining a Benefit Comedy Show for the striking workers instead. In a quote to The Hollywood Reporter, Okatsuka said, "I'm a union girl... We're only as strong as the people behind the scenes!! We're one unit, so we must move as such. I was supposed to host the awards this Saturday. A day of celebrating the hard work of artists in one of the strongest unions in the U.S.. But could we really celebrate while the staff, who help support the union are asking to be heard of their needs? I'm honored to stand with them."

== Winners and Nominees ==
Winners are listed first in boldface.

=== Film ===
**Best Original Screenplay**: **Sinners – Ryan Coogler**; Black Bag – David Koepp; If I Had Legs I'd Kick You – Mary Bronstein; Marty Supreme – Ronald Bronstein & Josh Safdie; Weapons – Zach Cregger	**Best Adapted Screenplay**: **One Battle After Another – Paul Thomas Anderson; screen story by Paul Thomas Anderson; inspired by the novel Vineland by Thomas Pynchon**; Bugonia – Will Tracy; based on the film Save the Green Planet by Jang Joon-hwan; Frankenstein – Guillermo del Toro; based on the novel by Mary Shelley; Hamnet – Chloé Zhao & Maggie O'Farrell; based on the novel by O'Farrell; Train Dreams – Clint Bentley & Greg Kwedar; based on the novella by Denis Johnson
**Best Documentary Screenplay**: **2000 Meters to Andriivka – Mstyslav Chernov**; Becoming Led Zeppelin – Bernard MacMahon & Allison McGourty; White with Fear – Andrew Goldberg

=== Television ===
**Drama Series**: **The Pitt (HBO Max) – Cynthia Adarkwa, Simran Baidwan, Valerie Chu, R. Scott Gemmill, Elyssa Gershman, Joe Sachs, Noah Wyle**; Andor (Disney+) – Tom Bissell, Dan Gilroy, Tony Gilroy, Beau Willimon; Pluribus (Apple TV) – Vera Blasi, Jenn Carroll, Vince Gilligan, Jonny Gomez, Peter Gould, Ariel Levine, Gordon Smith, Alison Tatlock; Severance (Apple TV) – Adam Countee, Mohamad El Masri, Dan Erickson, Mark Friedman, Anna Ouyang Moench, K.C. Perry, Megan Ritchie, Erin Wagoner, Beau Willimon, Wei-Ning Yu; The White Lotus (HBO Max) – Mike White	**Comedy Series**: **The Studio (Apple TV) – Evan Goldberg, Alex Gregory, Peter Huyck, Frida Perez, Seth Rogen**; Abbott Elementary (ABC) – Quinta Brunson, Ava Coleman, Lizzy Darrell, Riley Dufurrena, Justin Halpern, Joya McCrory, Chad Morton, Morgan Murphy, Brittani Nichols, Rebekka Pesqueira, Kate Peterman, Brian Rubenstein, Patrick Schumacker, Justin Tan, Jordan Temple, Garrett Werner; The Chair Company (HBO Max) – Zach Kanin, Gary Richardson, Tim Robinson, Marika Sawyer, Sarah Schneider, John Solomon; Hacks (HBO Max) – Genevieve Aniello, Lucia Aniello, Paul W. Downs, Jess Dweck, Ariel Karlin, Andrew Law, Carolyn Lipka, Joe Mande, Aisha Muharrar, Bridget Parker, Pat Regan, Samantha Riley, Jen Statsky; The Rehearsal (HBO Max) – Nathan Fielder, Carrie Kemper, Adam Locke-Norton, Eric Notarnicola
**New Series**: **The Pitt (HBO Max) – Cynthia Adarkwa, Simran Baidwan, Valerie Chu, R. Scott Gemmill, Elyssa Gershman, Joe Sachs, Noah Wyle**; The Chair Company (HBO Max) – Zach Kanin, Gary Richardson, Tim Robinson, Marika Sawyer, Sarah Schneider, John Solomon; Pluribus (Apple TV) – Vera Blasi, Jenn Carroll, Vince Gilligan, Jonny Gomez, Peter Gould, Ariel Levine, Gordon Smith, Alison Tatlock; The Studio (Apple TV) – Evan Goldberg, Alex Gregory, Peter Huyck, Frida Perez, Seth Rogen; Task (HBO Max) – Brad Ingelsby & David Obzud	**Limited Series**: **Dying for Sex (FX/Hulu) – Sheila Callaghan, Harris Danow, Madeleine George, Elizabeth Meriwether, Amelia Roper, Kim Rosenstock, Sasha Stewart, Sabrina Wu, Keisha Zollar**; The Beast in Me (Netflix) – Howard Gordon, C.A. Johnson, Ali Liebegott, Daniel Pearle, Gabe Rotter, Erika Sheffer, Mike Skerrett; Black Rabbit (Netflix) – Zach Baylin, Sarah Gubbins, Kate Susman, Andrew Hinderaker, Stacy Osei-Kuffour, Carlos Rios; Death by Lightning (Netflix) – Mike Makowsky; Sirens (Netflix) – Bekah Brunstetter, Dan LeFranc, Colin McKenna, Molly Smith Metzler
**TV & New Media Motion Pictures**: **Deep Cover (Prime Video) – Derek Connolly & Colin Trevorrow**; The Best You Can (Sony Pictures Home Entertainment) – Michael J. Weithorn; The Life List (Netflix) – Adam Brooks; based on the novel by Lori Nelson Spielman; Swiped (Hulu) – Bill Parker & Rachel Lee Goldenberg and Kim Caramele	**Animation**: **"Shira Can’t Cook" – Long Story Short (Netflix) – Mehar Sethi**; “Abe League of Their Moe” – The Simpsons (Fox) – Joel H. Cohen; "Don’t Worry, Be Hoopy" – Bob's Burgers (Fox) – Lindsey Stoddart; "It’s a Beef-derful Life" – The Great North (Fox) – Lizzie Molyneux-Logelin & Wendy Molyneux; "Parahormonal Activity" – The Simpsons (Fox) – Loni Steele Sosthand; "Scared Screenless" – Futurama (Hulu) – Bill Odenkirk
**Episodic Drama**: **"7:00 A.M." – The Pitt (HBO Max) – R. Scott Gemmill**; "A Still Small Voice" – Task (HBO Max) – Brad Ingelsby; "Charm Offensive" – Pluribus (Apple TV) – Jonny Gomez; "Execution" – The Handmaid's Tale (Hulu) – Eric Tuchman; "Got Milk" – Pluribus (Apple TV) – Ariel Levine; "Reunion" – Forever (Netflix) – Mara Brock Akil	**Episodic Comedy**: **"Prelude" – The Righteous Gemstones (HBO Max) – John Carcieri, Jeff Fradley, Danny R. McBride**; "A Call From God" – Mo (Netflix) – Mohammed Amer & Harris Danow; "Pilot's Code" – The Rehearsal (HBO Max) – Nathan Fielder, Carrie Kemper, Adam Locke-Norton, Eric Notarnicola; "The Promotion" – The Studio (Apple TV) – Seth Rogen & Evan Goldberg & Peter Huyck & Alex Gregory & Frida Perez; "The Sleazy Georgian" – Poker Face (Peacock) – Megan Amram; "Worms" – The Bear (FX/Hulu) – Ayo Edebiri & Lionel Boyce
**Comedy/Variety – Talk or Sketch Series**: **Last Week Tonight with John Oliver (HBO Max) – Daniel O'Brien, Owen Parsons, Charlie Redd, Joanna Rothkopf, Seena Vali, Johnathan Appel, Ali Barthwell, Tim Carvell, Liz Hynes, Ryan Ken, Sofía Manfredi, John Oliver, Taylor Kay Phillips, Chrissy Shackelford**; The Daily Show (Comedy Central) – Dan Amira, Lauren Sarver Means, Daniel Radosh, David Angelo, Nicole Conlan, Devin Delliquanti, Zach DiLanzo, Jen Flanz, Jason Gilbert, Dina Hashem, Scott Hercman, Josh Johnson, David Kibuuka, Matt Koff, Matt O'Brien, Joe Opio, Randall Otis, Zhubin Parang, Kat Radley, Lanee' Sanders, Scott Sherman, Jon Stewart, Ashton Womack, Sophie Zucker; Have I Got News for You (CNN, HBO Max) – Mason Steinberg, Kris Acimovic, Jim Biederman, Daniel Chamberlain, Jodi Lennon, Michael Pielocik, Jill Twiss; Late Night with Seth Meyers (NBC) – Alex Baze, Seth Reiss, Mike Scollins, Sal Gentile, Jermaine Affonso, Bryan Donaldson, Matt Goldich, Jenny Hagel, John Lutz, Seth Meyers, Amber Ruffin, Mike Shoemaker, Ben Warheit, Jeff Wright; Saturday Night Live (NBC) – Alison Gates, Erik Kenward, Streeter Seidell, Kent Sublette, Bryan Tucker, Dan Bulla, Will Stephen, Auguste White, Celeste Yim, Steven Castillo, Michael Che, Mike DiCenzo, Jimmy Fowlie, Sudi Green, Martin Herlihy, John Higgins, Steve Higgins, Colin Jost, Allie Levitan, Ben Marshall, Lorne Michaels, Jake Nordwind, Ceara O'Sullivan, Moss Perricone, Carl Tart, Asha Ward, Pete Schultz, Rosebud Baker, Megan Callahan-Shah, Dennis McNicholas, Josh Patten, KC Shornima; They Call It Late Night with Jason Kelce (ESPN) – Jon Glaser, Andy Blitz, Kevin Dorff, Tami Sagher	**Comedy/Variety – Specials**: **Marc Maron: Panicked (HBO Max) – Marc Maron**; 82nd Annual Golden Globes (CBS) – Barry Adelman, Nefetari Spencer, Mike Gibbons, Brian Frange, Sean O'Connor, Alex Baze, Bob Castrone, Chris Convy, Anna Drezen, Jess Dweck, Noah Garfinkel, Nikki Glaser, Lauren Greenberg, Ben Hoffman, Ian Karmel, Andrew Law, Mike Lawrence, Jon Macks, Bonnie McFarlane, Chris Spencer, Matt Whitaker; The Daily Show Presents: Jordan Klepper Fingers the Pulse: MAGA: The Next Generation (Comedy Central) – Ian Berger, Devin Delliquanti, Jen Flanz, Jordan Klepper, Zhubin Parang, Scott Sherman; Conan O'Brien: The Kennedy Center Mark Twain Prize for American Humor (Netflix) – Jon Macks, Chris Convy, Lauren Greenberg, Skyler Higley, Ian Karmel, Sean O'Connor; SNL50: The Anniversary Special (NBC) – James Anderson, Dan Bulla, Megan Callahan Shah, Michael Che, Mikey Day, Mike DiCenzo, James Downey, Tina Fey, Jimmy Fowlie, Alison Gates, Sudi Green, Jack Handey, Steve Higgins, Colin Jost, Erik Kenward, Dennis McNicholas, Seth Meyers, Lorne Michaels, John Mulaney, Jake Nordwind, Ceara O'Sullivan, Josh Patten, Paula Pell, Simon Rich, Pete Schultz, Streeter Seidell, Emily Spivey, Kent Sublette, Bryan Tucker, Auguste White
**Quiz and Audience Participation**: **Celebrity Jeopardy! (ABC) – Bobby Patton, Kyle Beakley, Michael Davies, Terence Gray, Amy Ozols, Tim Siedell, David Levinson-Wilk**; Jeopardy! (ABC) – Marcus Brown, Buzzy Cohen, Michael Davies, John Duarte, Mark Gaberman, Debbie Griffin, Jim Rhine, Michele Loud, Robert McClenaghan, Amy Ozols, Billy Wisse	**Daytime Drama**: **The Young and the Restless (CBS/Paramount+) – Jeff Beldner, Marla Kanelos, Dave Ryan, Susan Banks, Amanda L. Beall, Marin Gazzaniga, Rebecca McCarty, Madeleine Phillips**; Beyond the Gates (CBS) – Michele Val Jean, Robert Guza Jr., Sara A. Bibel, Jazmen Darnell Brown, Ron Carlivati, Susan Dansby, Cheryl L. Davis, Christopher Dunn, Gregori J. Martin, Lynn Martin, Danielle Paige, Judy Tate, Teresa Zimmerman; General Hospital (ABC) – Elizabeth Korte, Chris Van Etten, Cathy LePard, Emily Culliton, Nigel Campbell, Suzanne Flynn, Charlotte Gibson, Kate Hall, Stacey Pulwer, Ryan Quan, Louise Rozett, Scott Sickles, Micah Steinberg
**Short Form Streaming**: **The Rabbit Hole with Jimmy Kimmel (YouTube) – Jimmy Kimmel & Jesse Joyce**; Sesame Street YouTube: Take a Moment with Jonathan Bailey (YouTube) – Andrew Moriarty

==== Children ====
**Children's Episodic, Long Form and Specials**
- **"When We Lose Someone" – Tab Time (YouTube) – Sean Presant**
  - The First Snow of Fraggle Rock (Apple TV) – Matt Fusfeld & Alex Cuthbertson
  - "Stay Out of the Basement: Part I" – Goosebumps (Disney+) – Rob Letterman, Hilary Winston
  - Merry Giftmas (Netflix) – Halcyon Person
  - "I Play Dodgeball with Cannibals" – Percy Jackson and the Olympians (Disney+) – Craig Silverstein, Rick Riordan

==== Documentary ====
**Documentary Script – Current Events**
- **"Trump's Power & the Rule of Law" – Frontline (PBS) – Michael Kirk & Mike Wiser**
  - "Syria After Assad" – Frontline (PBS) – Martin Smith
  - "The Rise and Fall of Terrorgram" – Frontline (PBS) – Thomas Jennings and A. C. Thompson
  - "The Rise of RFK Jr." – Frontline (PBS) – Michael Kirk & Mike Wiser
**Documentary Script – Other Than Current Events**
- **"Forgotten Hero: Walter White and the NAACP" – American Experience (PBS) – Rob Rapley**
  - "Change, Not Charity: The Americans with Disabilities Act" – American Experience (PBS) – Chana Gazit
  - "Clearing the Air: The War on Smog" – American Experience (PBS) – Peter Yost & Edna Alburquerque
  - Matter of Mind: My Alzheimer's (PBS) – Jason Sussberg
  - "Mr. Polaroid" – American Experience (PBS) – Gene Tempest

==== News ====
**News Script – Regularly Scheduled, Bulletin, or Breaking Report**: **"Devastating Flooding in Texas" – World News Tonight with David Muir (ABC News) – David Muir, Karen Mooney, Dave Bloch**; "The L.A. Wildfires" – World News Tonight with David Muir (ABC News) – David Muir, Dave Bloch, Karen Mooney	**News Script – Analysis, Feature, or Commentary**: **Remembering Palestinian Journalists Killed by Israeli Forces – Ayman (MSNBC) – Lisa Salinas**; Eye on America: Coldwater Creek – CBS News – Cait Bladt; Gaza, Hannah Arendt, and The Banality of Evil – Ayman (MSNBC) – Basel Hamdan; "Mysterious Russian Deaths" – 60 Minutes (CBS News) – Cecilia Vega & Oriana Zill de Granados; "Uphill Battle" – CBS News Sunday Morning (CBS News) – Richard Buddenhagen, Kay Lim, Lesley Stahl
**Digital News**: **"An Isolated Boarding School Promised to Help Troubled Girls. Former Students Say They Were Abused" – HuffPost – Sebastian Murdock & Taiyler Mitchell**; "Altadena Residents Know Their Community Is Worth Rebuilding. Can They Protect Its Legacy?" – HuffPost – Taiyler Mitchell; "American Siberia" – Slate – Alexander Sammon; "How Cassie's Lawsuit Against Diddy Galvanized A Movement of Survivors" – HuffPost – Njera Perkins & Taiyler Mitchell; "Trump Sent Them to Hell. Now He's Erasing Them Altogether" – HuffPost – Matt Shuham & Jessica Schulberg

==== Radio/Audio ====
**Radio/Audio Documentary**: **"Jerry Lewis' Lost Holocaust Clown Movie" – Decoder Ring (Slate) – Max Freedman**; "The Life And Death Of A Boeing Whistleblower" – The Journal (Spotify) – Heather Rogers; "Why Women Kill" – What Next (Slate) – Mary Harris & Elena Schwartz	**Radio/Audio News Script – Regularly Scheduled, Bulletin, or Breaking Report**: **"ABC News Radio Top of the Hour News" – ABC News Radio – Robert Hawley**; "CBS World News Roundup" – CBS News – Paul Farry & Steve Kathan
**Radio/Audio News Script – Analysis, Feature, or Commentary**: **"The Life and Legacy of Jimmy Carter" – CBS News Radio – Gail Lee**; "Hasan Piker Knew Charlie Kirk" – What Next (Slate) – Mary Harris & Madeline Ducharme; "How Will We Feed Our Neighbors?" – Slate – Mary Harris & Anna Phillips; "We Made a Memecoin" – Slate – Lizzie O'Leary, Evan Campbell, Patrick Fort

==== Promotional Writing ====
**On Air Promotion**
- **"CBS Comedy" – CBS – Dan Greenberger**
  - "Behind the Crown: King & Conqueror EPK" – CBS – Molly Neylan

== Honorary Awards ==
- Stephen Colbert - Walter Bernstein Award for "willingness to confront social injustice in the face of adversity"
- Terry George - Ian McLellan Hunter Award for Career Achievement
- Diana Son - Richard B. Jablow Award for Devoted Service
