= Gabe Henry =

American author

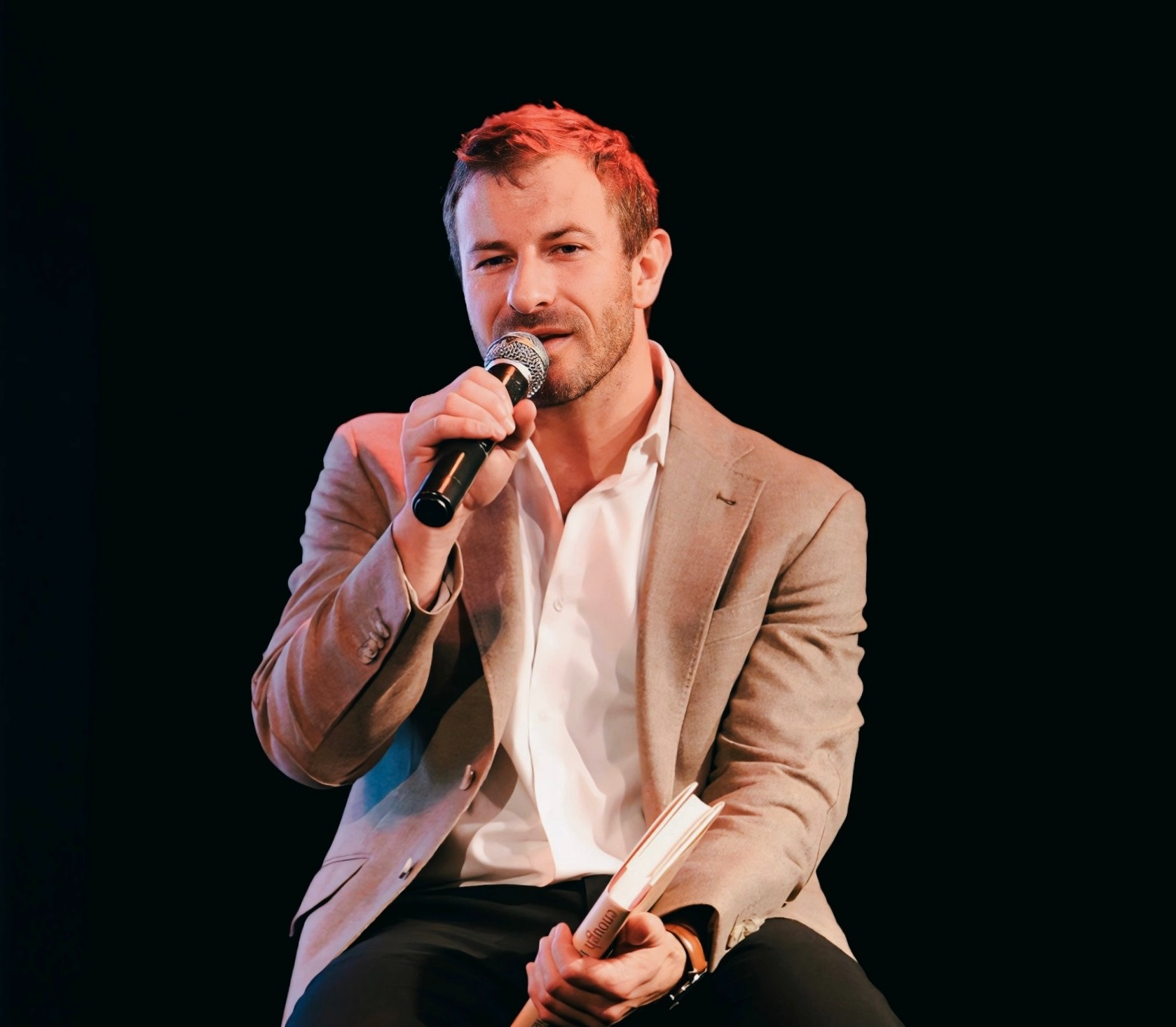
- Henry in 2025
- Born: 1988 (age 37–38)
- Occupations: Author, humorist, comedy talent booker
- Known for: Enough is Enuf; Eating Salad Drunk; What the Fact?!
- Writing career
- Genres: Humor, non-fiction, satire, poetry
- Website: gabehenry.com

Gabe Henry is an American author and humorist best known for his book Enough is Enuf: Our Failed Attempts to Make English Easier to Spell (2025), a comedic history of the simplified spelling movement and its efforts to reform English orthography.

== Books ==
=== Enough is Enuf ===
Enough is Enuf: Our Failed Attempts to Make English Easier to Spell (2025) chronicles five centuries of English spelling reform efforts from figures such as Benjamin Franklin, Noah Webster, Mark Twain, Eliza Burnz, George Bernard Shaw, and Theodore Roosevelt. Henry explores a range of reforms, including proposals to respell "laugh" as "laf," "love" as "luv," and "tongue" as "tung," and links them to later developments in advertising wordplay, pop-music misspelling, and digital shorthand.

==== Critical reception ====
On May 4, 2025, The New York Times Book Review featured Enough is Enuf as its cover story. The Guardian called Enough is Enuf "amusing and enlightening" and The Wall Street Journal described it as “a smart, lighthearted chronicle of simplified spelling," noting that "it’s fitting that our guide through this history is a humorist." In a nod to simplified spelling, New York magazine wrote: "Reed it and lurn a thing or too."

=== Eating Salad Drunk ===
During the 2020 Covid shutdowns, Henry curated and edited Eating Salad Drunk: Haikus for the Burnout Age by Comedy Greats (St. Martin's Press), a poetry collaboration with Jerry Seinfeld, Margaret Cho, Bob Odenkirk, Roy Wood Jr., Eva Victor, Ayo Edebiri, Atsuko Okatsuka, Mike Birbiglia, Aubrey Plaza, Sasheer Zamata, Ray Romano, Maria Bamford, Janeane Garofalo, and other comedians. The project challenged standup comics to write one-liner jokes within the 5-7-5 syllable pattern of Japanese haiku.

Henry conceived Eating Salad Drunk during the Covid-19 pandemic, when the shutdown of live events left many comedians out of work. Henry was working as a talent booker and manager at littlefield, a Brooklyn comedy venue, and the abrupt halt prompted him to organize a collaborative project among comedians. All proceeds from Eating Salad Drunk were donated to Comedy Gives Back, a nonprofit supporting comedians in financial hardship.

==== Critical reception ====
Comedian Dick Cavett described Eating Salad Drunk as "a sparkling collection of bright jewels of wit and wisdom." Vulture ranked Eating Salad Drunk one of the Best Comedy Books of 2022.

=== What the Fact?! ===
What the Fact?! 365 Strange Days in History, a day-by-day collection of funny and obscure historical anecdotes, was published by Chronicle Books in 2018.
