= HDP (Pluribus) =

- Pluribus episode
- Carol shows a human head to the camera. The prop was modeled after the head of series creator Vince Gilligan.
- Episode no.: Season 1 Episode 6
- Directed by: Gandja Monteiro
- Written by: Vera Blasi
- Cinematography by: Marshall Adams
- Editing by: Skip Macdonald
- Original air date: December 5, 2025
- Running time: 50 minutes

Guest appearances
- John Cena as himself; Samba Schutte as Koumba Diabaté; François Guétary as Blofinger; Soledad Campos as Maternal Other; Anna Mhairi as Vesper; Max Reeves as Margaux; Olivia Rouyre as Genevieve

Episode chronology
← Previous "Got Milk"	Next → "The Gap"

"HDP" is the sixth episode of the American post-apocalyptic science fiction television series Pluribus. The episode was written by Vera Blasi, and directed by Gandja Monteiro. It was released on Apple TV on December 5, 2025.

The series is set in Albuquerque, New Mexico, and follows author Carol Sturka, who is one of only thirteen people in the world immune to the effects of "the Joining", resulting from an extraterrestrial virus that had transformed the world's human population into a peaceful and content hive mind (the "Others"). In the episode, Carol travels to Las Vegas to inform fellow survivor Koumba Diabaté about her new discoveries, but is surprised by the information he provides in turn.

The episode received highly positive reviews from critics, who praised the performances, character development, and humor.

== Plot ==
Carol briefly leaves the food packaging plant in shock, but returns with a camera to record her discovery: severed shrink wrapped human body parts. She returns home, where she prepares to send the recording to the other immune individuals, but she hesitates. Instead, she decides to drive to Las Vegas, hoping to meet up with fellow survivor Koumba Diabaté.

Diabaté has been living in the penthouse of the Westgate, having the Others partake in role-playing a James Bond-like poker game. The Others depart just as Carol arrives to present him with the evidence she gathered, but he reveals he is already aware of everything she uncovered. He plays her a video of John Cena, who explains that the Others cannot kill any animals or plants; hence, to sustain their bodies, they supplement their diet with human-derived protein (HDP) from dead bodies. Diabaté states that the Others will starve in the next ten years from the lack of readily available food. He mentions that the other immune individuals are trying to help them and that they all stay connected in a group chat, which excludes both Carol and Manousos. While Manousos refused to make contact with the Others and was therefore unaware of the other survivors, they voted to keep Carol out. She excuses herself to the bathroom, where she expresses devastation at the news.

The following morning, Diabaté makes Carol some breakfast and asks her to keep in touch with him. Before she leaves, he reveals that the immune cannot be straightforwardly assimilated by the Others; the process requires extracting their stem cells and customizing the virus for each individual. However, they cannot perform the extraction procedure without their consent, and Diabaté has already politely declined. The Others confirm this through a message to Carol on the casino marquee. Carol subsequently calls the Others to tell them she does not consent. After a final talk with Diabaté, Carol leaves Las Vegas.

Three days prior, Manousos completes scanning the radio frequencies, finding that only one of his recorded observations represents something other than static. The Others deliver Carol's first video to him, detailing that the Others cannot lie. Realizing he is not alone, Manousos finally leaves the office. He goes to his home to retrieve some items, refusing to accept help from the chaperone the Others sent to help him, his mother. With his radio signal notebook, several maps, and Carol's address on the envelope, he drives away.

== Production ==
=== Development ===
The episode was written by Vera Blasi, and directed by Gandja Monteiro. This marked Blasi's first writing credit and Monteiro's first directing credit.

The head that Carol shows to the camera at the beginning of the episode is a 3D printed bust of series creator Vince Gilligan's head. Gilligan described this as his first "Hitchcockian" cameo. The bust was created by scanning Gilligan's head using lidar technology; during this process, Gilligan also received a smaller bust replica of his head captioned with his name.

London-based duo Kit Sebastian (Kit Martin & Merve Erdem) produced and performed a cover of The Doors' 1967 song, People Are Strange which premiered on the episode. The song was charted on Shazam's Türkiye Risers and Global Viral Charts, being discovered over 90,000 times as of January 2026.

=== Writing ===
Vince Gilligan commented on the episode's reveal that the Others consume human-derived protein from dead bodies, "It seemed self-evident at a certain point that, if you presuppose a world in which these people are so peaceful that they will not kill, that means they have to be vegetarians. But wait, maybe it's more than that, because if you've got to take it to the nth degree, that means you can't lop down a field full of corn. You can't even be a vegetarian. You’ve gotta eat pre-existing food." Gilligan further said "I mean, these people are hippy-dippy to the nth degree. They're beyond Jainists. So then you think, OK, so they’ve got to eat human flesh. They don't kill to obtain it. It's like roadkill or dead animals that died of their own accord, of old age or whatever; same goes with people."

Samba Schutte said that Diabaté used hundreds of Others to live out his fantasies because "he's probably as alone as Carol." He said, "it was really fantastic to be able to experience Mr. Diabaté’s fantasy, basically. He wants to be Elvis. He wants to be James Bond. He wants to be president. He wants to roleplay with the others, and he can fulfill his greatest wishes." Schutte also said that it was important to portray Diabaté as a person who enjoys his new life but without being "sleazy nor creepy", explaining "Of course he's going to embrace that and live out his fantasies. In that sense, he's a child in a candy store instead of a pimp living his biggest life." Diabaté's opening scene in the Westgate was filmed over the course of three nights, and required up to 200 extras.

=== Casting ===
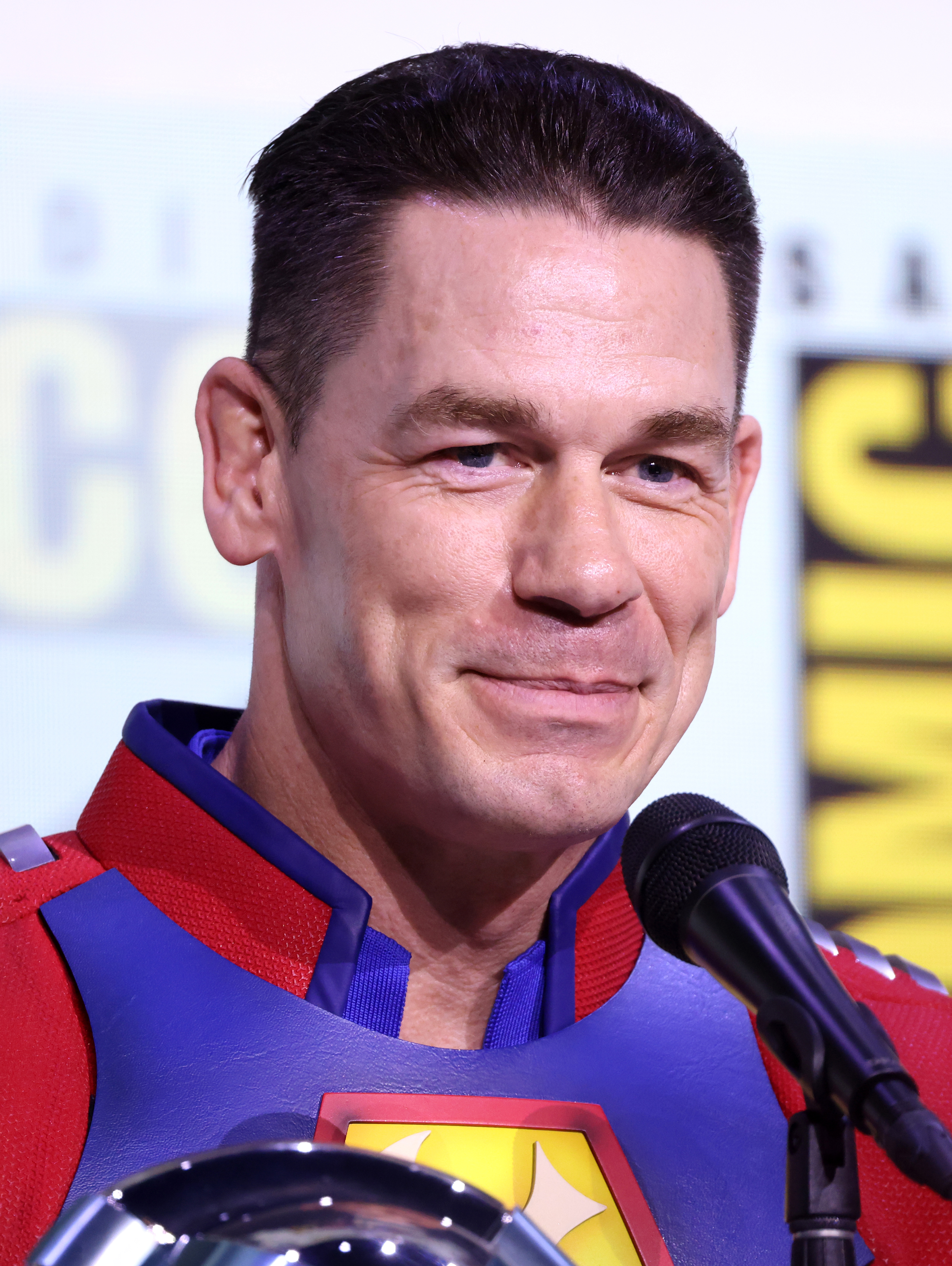
John Cena makes a cameo as himself in the episode

John Cena makes a cameo appearance in the episode as a version of himself controlled by the Others in a video message to Carol. Vince Gilligan said that the idea of using Cena came up when the writers were developing the script: "We just thought, 'Who better than John Cena to make palatable the idea of eating human flesh, you know?'" The cameo was filmed on a weekend in Tampa, Florida, where Cena resides, and was completed within 24 hours due to his schedule.

Schutte commented on Diabaté using Cena as reference, "I love that my character hangs out with John Cena and learns wrestling moves from him. He also addresses him as John, which Carol hates. There's a side of Koumba Diabaté that's like, 'Hey, I see these people as individuals too. Even though they're part of the hive, they still have individual qualities.'" Rhea Seehorn added, "I thought it was fun that you [Vince] told me the discussions you guys were having about how the Others would have specifically picked who they think Diabaté thinks is a figure of authority to tell them that. 'Cause for the video, he is asking for somebody that he thinks is the voice of reason. And he picks John Cena, which makes me laugh."

=== Filming ===
The Westgate Las Vegas casino and hotel was used throughout this episode, including its penthouse Imperial Sky Villas. It was selected due to the combination of its Italian look, the gaudiness of the penthouse rooms, and the signage needed for the episode. Gran Canaria in the Canary Islands was used for the city street scenes representing Manousos' home, with signs from Paraguay brought to temporarily replace those in the city.

== Reception ==
"HDP" earned highly positive reviews from critics. Scott Collura of IGN gave the episode an "amazing" 9 out of 10 rating and wrote in his verdict, "Pluribus hits a new high with Episode 6, 'HDP,' as Vince Gilligan and his team continue to find new ways to subvert end-of-the-world tropes while also keeping us, the viewers, off balance. Be honest: Who saw the complete deflation of Carol's discovery coming so soon? Meanwhile, the world-building continues to be fascinating as we learn more and more about the Joined, who have created an increasingly precarious scenario for humankind itself. And to top it all off, John Cena shows up for the best – and most surprising – cameo of the year."

Noel Murray of The A.V. Club gave the episode a "B+" grade and wrote, "Throughout this Pluribus season, we've only seen the Joined in their natural state a few times. In episode one, as the takeover spread, we saw them behaving robotically, unconcerned with how they might appear to anyone not in the collective. In last week's outing, when Carol was asleep, we saw them silently pack up and move out of Albuquerque. And in this week’s 'HDP,' they become eerily silent and begin joylessly cleaning up the Verona Sky Villa when their host is gone."

Scott Tobias of Vulture gave the episode a 4 star rating out of 5 and wrote, "After last week's cliffhanging gasp, it's a pleasure to watch the air seep out of a genuinely shocking revelation. All the quality sleuthing that brought Carol to a refrigerated warehouse in Albuquerque led to her discovering that the shrink-wrapped foodstuffs so neatly stored on the shelves include human body parts. The Soylent Green is people, and now Carol gets to play Charlton Heston, warning survivors of this diabolical alien plot that's been happening under their noses."

Sean T. Collins of Decider wrote, "In essence, this episode asks us to spend its opening minutes watching something that isn't happening, that doesn't matter, and that isn't even necessary, given that we already learned the kind of person Mr. Diabaté is during our first meeting, and that the mere existence of his Las Vegas digs conveys this too. Why waste valuable screen time on an inert Austin Powers riff?" Carly Lane of Collider gave the episode a 8 out of 10 rating and wrote, "'HDP,' written by Vera Blasi and directed by Gandja Monteiro, feels like a quiet episode despite taking place in a city that notoriously never sleeps, but it also leads to some unexpected and potentially critical worldbuilding reveals — one of them courtesy of the show's most surprising cameo yet."

Josh Rosenberg of Esquire wrote of Manuosos, "Quite possibly, he's even more miserable than Carol. That may be exactly what we need." Carissa Pavlica of TV Fanatic gave the episode a 4 star rating out of 5 and wrote, "Pluribus is such a quiet show. Instead of trying to persuade us of its intent in massive, broad strokes, it uses a subtle approach to get under our skin. And boy oh boy, is it doing that. After every episode, I have to sit with myself for a bit to process it."
