= Writers Guild Staff Union strike =

American labor dispute between the WGAW and its staff

2026 Writers Guild Staff Union Strike
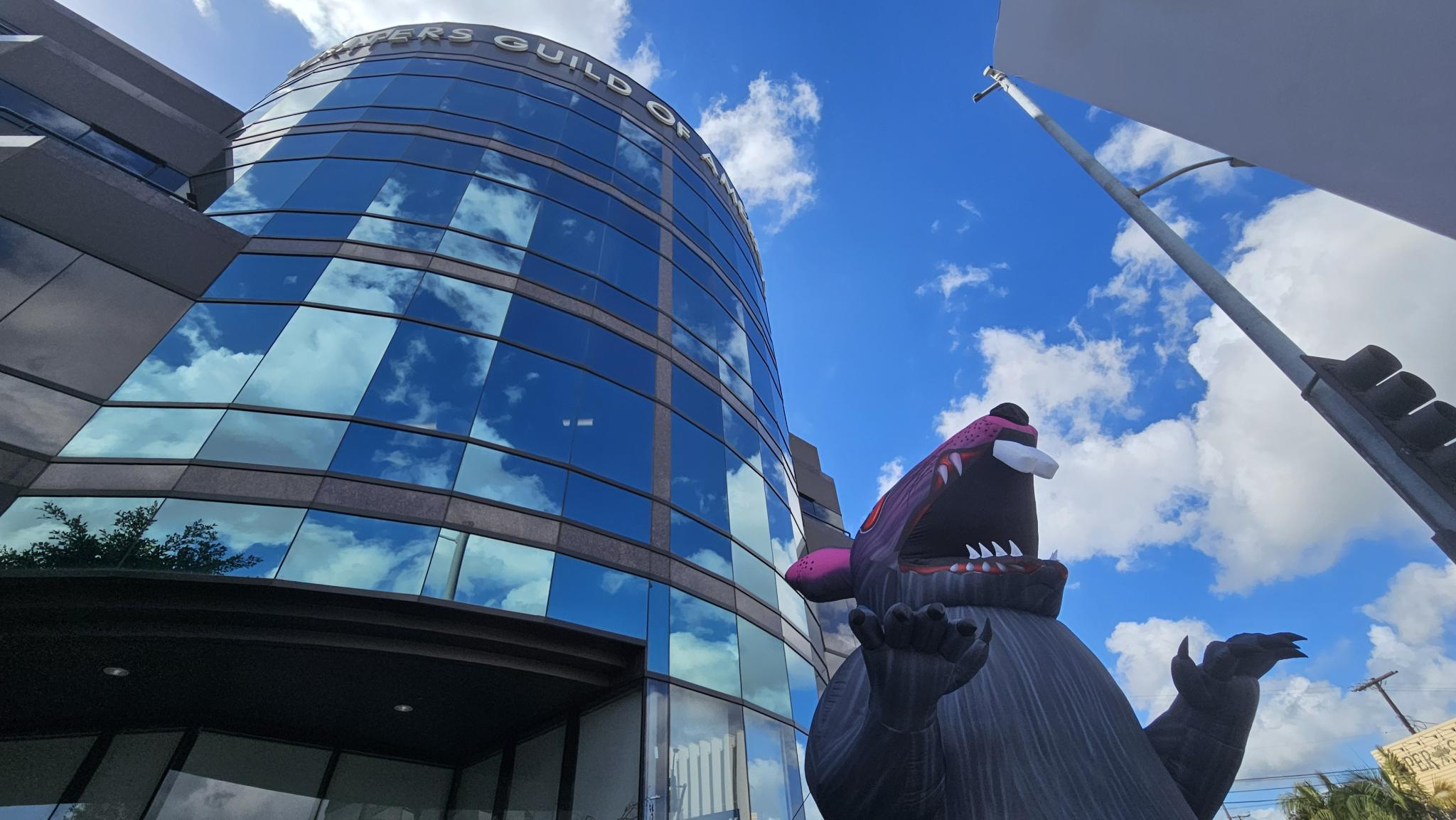
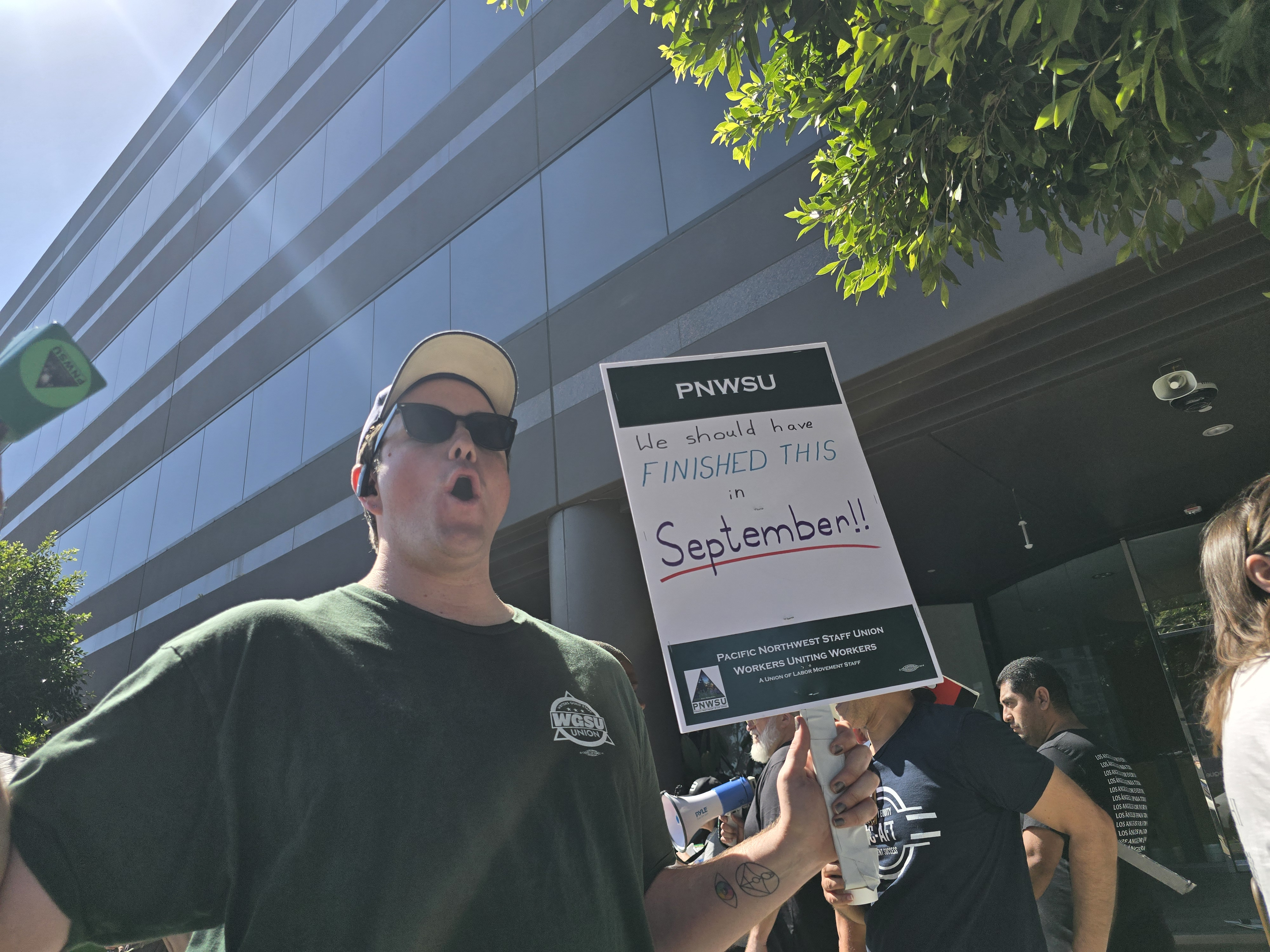
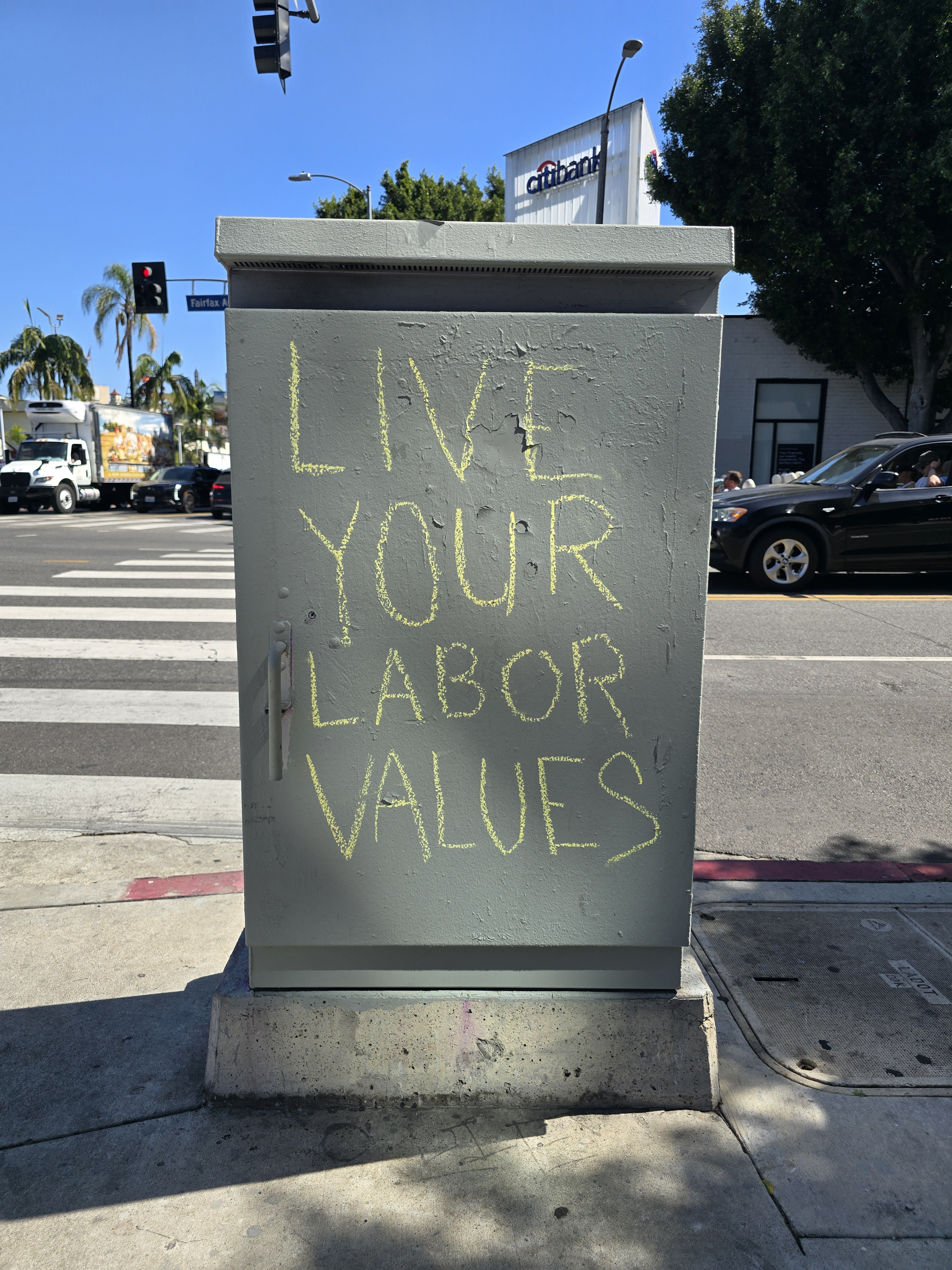
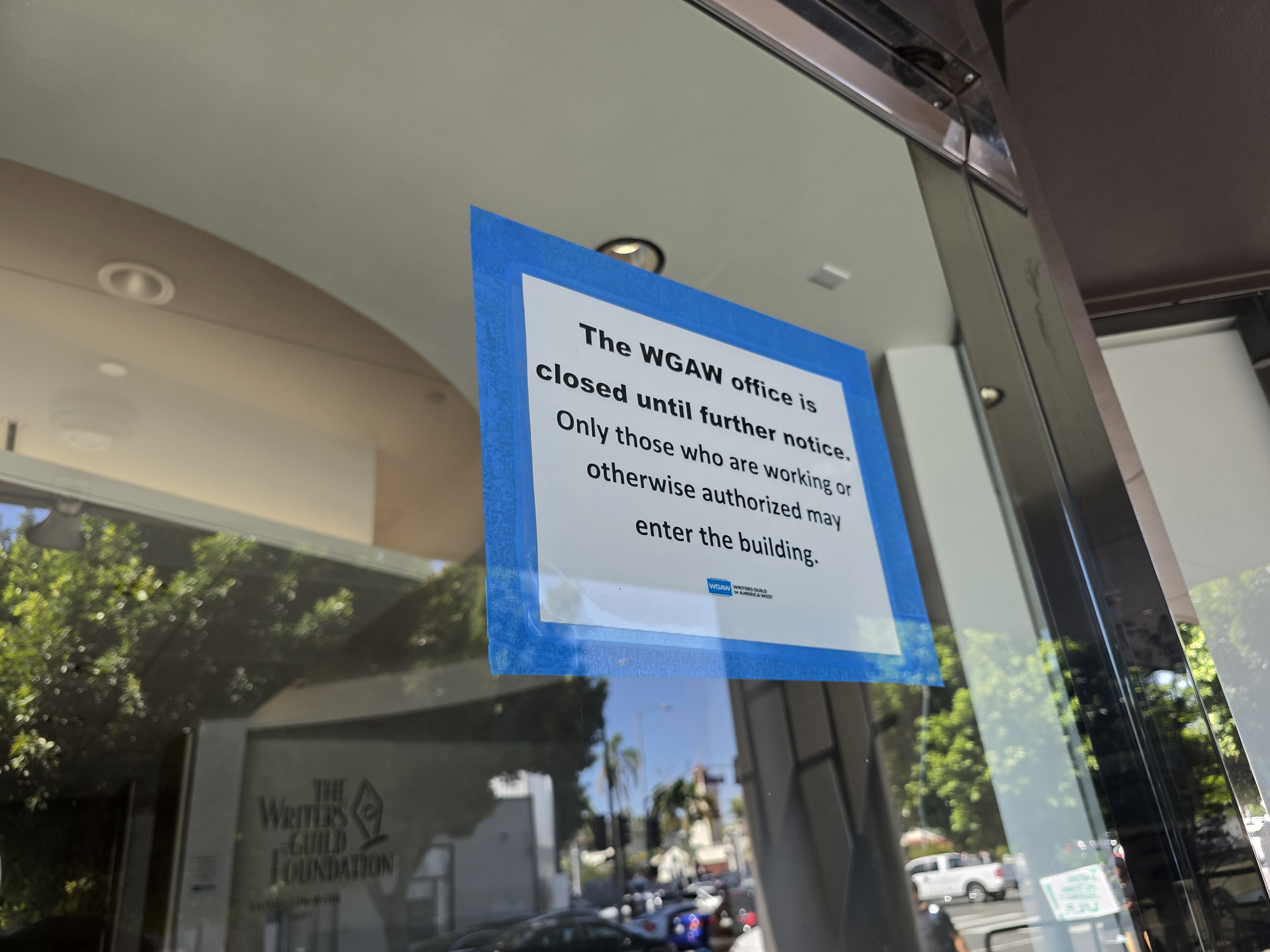
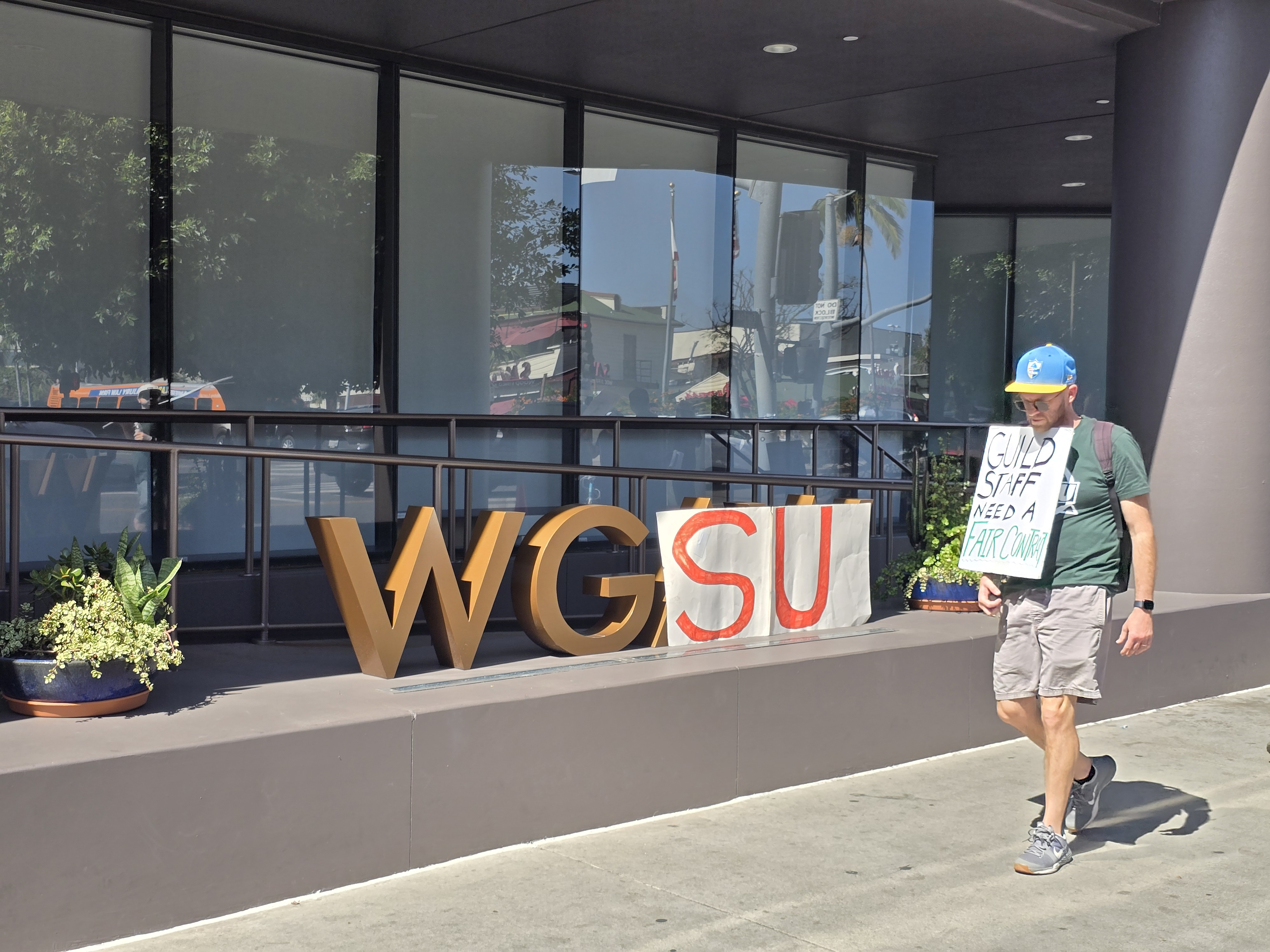
- Clockwise from top: Scabby the Rat sits underneath the Writers Guild of America West façade on the SW corner of 3rd & Fairfax; Utility box on Fairfax defaced with chalk reads: "Live Your Labor Values"; Posterboard placed over WGAW signage changes it to read "WGSU"; A closed office notice placed on the WGAW front door by Guild Management; A striking worker marches and chants on Fairfax. Their picket sign reads, "We should have FINISHED THIS in September!!"
- Date: February 17 – May 8, 2026 (2 months and 21 days; 80 days)
- Location: Writers Guild of America West Headquarters; 7000 West 3rd Street, Los Angeles, CA 90048; Writers Guild Theater; 135 South Doheny Drive, Beverly Hills, CA 90211; SAG-AFTRA Plaza; 5757 Wilshire Boulevard, Los Angeles, CA 90036
- Caused by: Lack of a first collective bargaining agreement between the WGSU and the WGAW
- Methods: Strike action; Work stoppage; Picketing
- Result: Tentative agreement reached on May 8, 2026; contract ratified on May 9, 2026; WGSU members gain,a wage floor of $57k, protection from retaliation in layoffs, and protection from replacement by artificial intelligence

Parties
Pacific Northwest Staff Union (PNWSU): Writers Guild Staff Union (WGSU)	Writers Guild of America West (WGAW) Management

Lead figures
PNWSU At-Large President; Brandon Tippy; WGSU Bargaining Committee Co-Chairs; Dylan Holmes; Missy Brown	WGAW Executive Director; Ellen Stutzman; WGAW General Council; Sean Graham

On Tuesday, February 17, 2026, the Writers Guild Staff Union (WGSU), went on strike against their employer, the Writers Guild of America West (WGAW), itself a labor union representing screenwriters in their western jurisdiction of the United States.

The WGSU alleged unfair labor practices, including retaliatory termination, bad faith surface bargaining, and surveillance of union activity. While the staff of the WGSU are not writers, many writers who they represent attended their picket line in the Fairfax District of Los Angeles to walk with their staff in solidarity. The Writers Guild Staff Union is a local chapter of the Pacific Northwest Staff Union (PNWSU), an independent industrial union focusing on organizing the staff who work at labor unions.

This unprecedented labor action led to substantial media coverage, and placed the WGAW in the position to either complete the contract with their staff, or end up in the middle of renegotiations for the 2026 Minimum Basic Agreement with the Alliance of Motion Picture and Television Producers (AMPTP) without the assistance of the staff. The WGAW chose the latter, and abandoned negotiations with the staff union on March 16, declaring publicly that they would not move any further in the staff union's direction. Instead, they declared they would focus on negotiating the MBA, work that would have ordinarily included staff labor. And so, the WGSU was forced to set up a picket line outside of SAG-AFTRA Plaza where MBA negotiations were taking place. Rather than push for their management to bargain the staff union CBA, the WGAW negotiating committee chose to side with the strikebreaking management team throughout the entirety of the 2026 MBA negotiations. This led to conflict, as staff members expressed anger and resentment at ostensible leaders in the labor movement crossing their picket line.

Members of the WGAW Board of Directors, the elected officers of the Guild, and members of the Negotiating Committee made various public statements condemning the striking staff for their tactics. In contrast, the strike also led to condemnation of the WGAW's management by many writers, and the cancellation of the West ceremony of the 2026 Writers Guild of America Awards. The Writers Guild of America East were alone in hosting their portion of the ceremony, as their staff was not on strike.

The strike continued into May, when a tentative agreement was mediated between management and the staff on May 8. The WGSU agreed to withdraw their outstanding demand for a wage scale, while the WGAW agreed to allow for seniority protections in layoffs and withdrew their demand that the CBA's No Strike clause also ban all other forms of concerted union activity in the workplace. The CBA was overwhelmingly ratified on May 10 after an election with the membership at Plummer Park in West Hollywood. The staff returned to work on May 11.

== Background ==
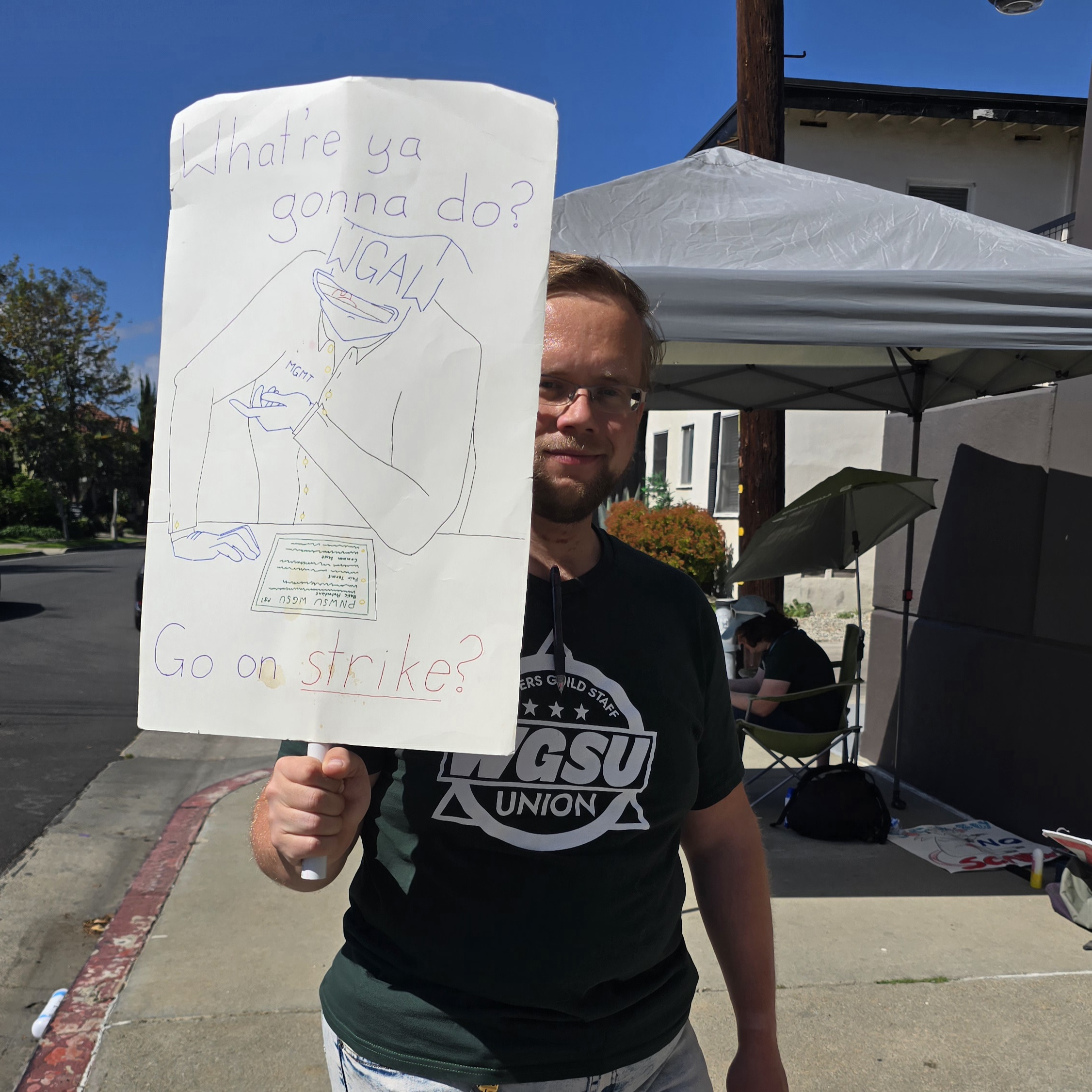
A striking worker pickets on Blackburn Avenue, outside the Guild parking garage, March 2026. Their picket sign features a caricature of WGAW Management and reads, "What're ya gonna do? Go on strike?"

The Writers Guild of America West is one of two Writers Guild of America unions that represent screenwriters who work in the American film industry. Operating with the jurisdiction west of the Mississippi River and centered on the production hubs in and around Hollywood in the city of Los Angeles, the WGAW is far larger than its eastern counterpart, the Writers Guild of America, East (WGAE). It has around 17,000 total members as of 2025.

=== Guild Staff Union (GSU) 2007-2012 ===
The staff of the Writers Guild of America West had been nonunion and unprotected by a collective bargaining agreement since the decertification of the previous staff union, the Guild Staff Union (GSU) in 2012. The GSU formed in the midst of the Great Recession and in the wake of both the 2007-2008 Writers Guild of America strike, in which Guild employees worked on picket line support, and the first layoffs in the Guild's history. The GSU was an independent union, and therefore did not have the organizational backing of an at-large organization. The GSU dissolved after a decertification campaign and election in 2012.

== WGSU organizing effort ==
For nearly five months in 2023, staff members of the WGAW worked once again to support screenwriters during the 2023 Writers Guild of America strike. They provided logistics, supplies, and organizational structure to ensure that striking writers were well-supplied on the picket lines in and around the city of Los Angeles, and to ensure that they continued to receive their residuals checks. This experience inspired many of the staff, most of whom were not present during the GSU years, to meet together in secret to organize another staff union.This experience inspired many of the staff, most of whom were not present during the GSU years, to meet together in secret to organize another staff union.

=== Pacific Northwest Staff Union ===
The Writers Guild West staff members who began to organize in secret chose to organize under the Pacific Northwest Staff Union (PNWSU).

PNWSU is an industrial union that represents workers in the labor industry. This position as the organizers of workers who work to organize other workers places them in a unique position in the American labor movement, as they exclusively bargain against the leadership and management of labor organizations. For this reason, PNWSU operates independently from the AFL-CIO. If they were affiliated with the AFL-CIO, as some staff unions are, it would place many of their employers in the same national organization. This is a large reason why staff union strikes are so vanishingly rare outside of PNWSU actions. Being independent allows for PNWSU to democratically choose their own organizing strategies and strike actions. In this position, PNWSU seeks to reform their employers to adopt radical democracy and an organizing model through their internal processes, contract bargaining, and strike action. In this instance, the Writers Guild of America West, despite operating in tandem nationally with the Writers Guild of America, East (WGAE), is also an independent union, while the WGAE is an AFL-CIO affiliate.

The Pacific Northwest Staff Union have organized and negotiated collective bargaining agreements for the staffmembers of many labor organizations, including various Service Employees International Union (SEIU) locals, various United Food and Commercial Workers (UFCW) locals, the Koreatown Immigrant Workers Alliance, (KIWA), and the Los Angeles County Federation of Labor.

Beginning on April 8, 2025, the OC of this organizing effort began to distribute union cards in the workplace. In the latter half of the month, WGAW management learned of this effort, and began to pull staffers into one-on-one meetings to interrogate them over union activity. They were threatened with layoffs and cut benefits if they signed union cards. Two days after these interrogations began, on April 21, Fátima Murrieta, an organizing committee member and member organizer for the WGAW was terminated. When asked for a statement, a representative for the WGAW told The Hollywood Reporter that she was terminated for cause, and denied that her firing was for union activity. Nevertheless, in response to her termination, the staff of the WGAW joined together to interrupt an executive meeting on the following day, April 22, to deliver to Ellen Stutzman, the WGAW executive director, their demand to organize, and their further demand for Murrieta's reinstatement.

Shortly after this announcement, the staff union voted to name themselves the Writers Guild Staff Union (WGSU), to commemorate the GSU unionization effort that came before them. On April 29, Rev. Matthew Wait of First Lutheran Church of Culver City & Palms arrived at WGAW Headquarters to facilitate the union card count, since he was a neutral third party and member of Clergy and Laity United for Economic Justice (CLUE Justice). He announced that the WGSU had achieved majority support, and the WGAW voluntarily recognized the WGSU.

=== CBA negotiations ===
In the following months, the WGSU performed bargaining surveys with their membership, and collected candidates for their Bargaining Committee (BC). They held their first bargaining session with Management on September 9, 2025, in the boardroom of the Guild Headquarters.

The WGSU accused the WGAW of ignoring the vast majority of their proposals. Over the course of five months, the WGSU alleged that the WGAW engaged in multiple counts of surface bargaining, and filed unfair labor practice charges to the National Labor Relations Board (NLRB) alleging that the WGAW had at several times "refused to bargain".

The WGAW denied this, saying that they delivered multiple comprehensive proposals to the staff union which provided for an increase in benefits, protections, and wages.

== Strike action ==
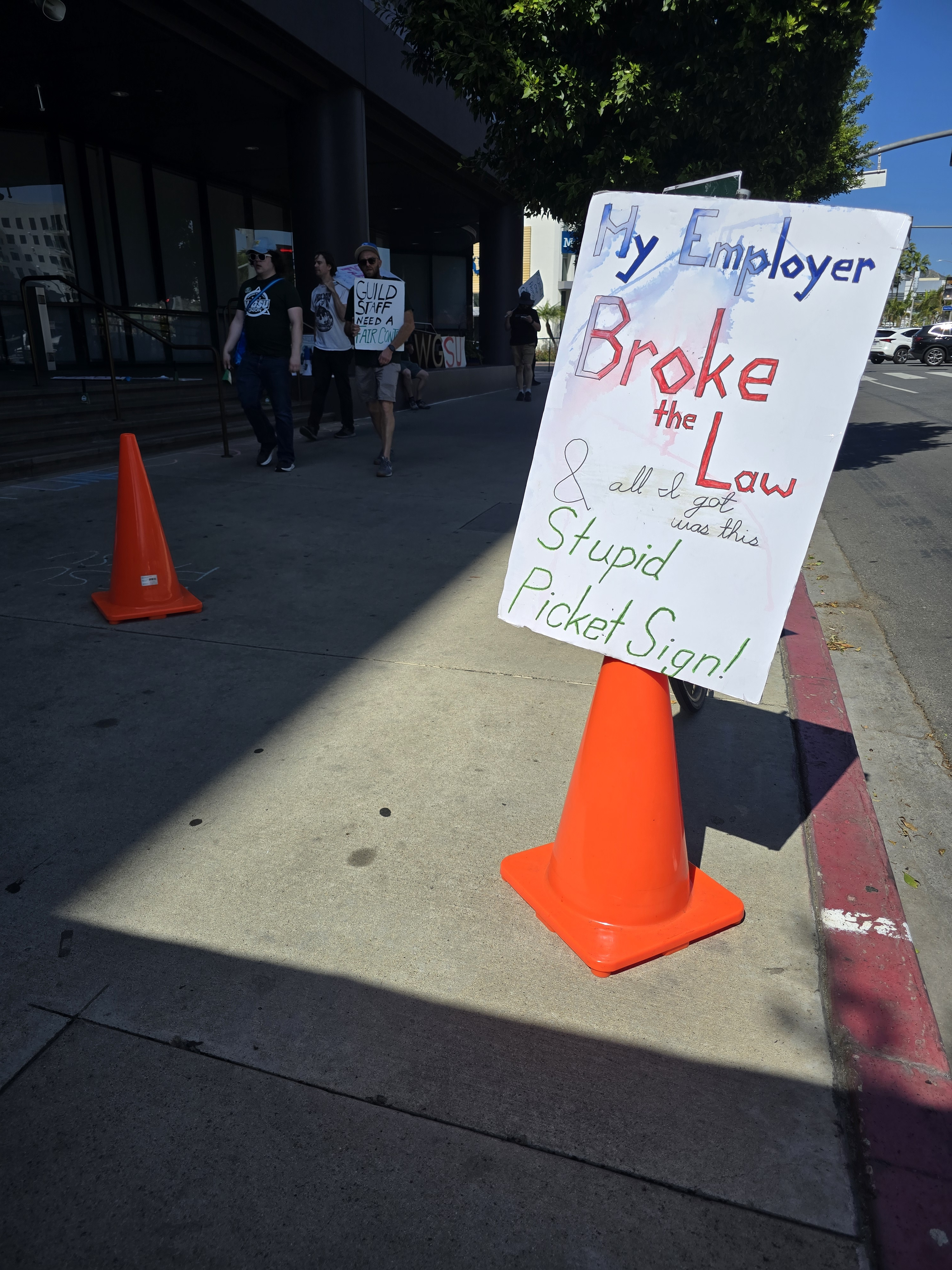
The primary picket line at the front of the Guild Headquarters on Fairfax Avenue. A picket sign on display reads, "My Employer Broke the Law & all I got was this Stupid Picket Sign!"

=== Strike authorization ===
In January 2026, the WGSU Bargaining Committee recommended to their membership that they vote to authorize a strike. On January 29, the WGSU announced that 100 of their members participated in the strike authorization vote, with an approval of 82%. They held further bargaining sessions with management, but the results of these talks remained unfruitful, and the elected leadership of the union decided to call for a walkout at noon on February 17. Their strike was based upon their allegations of Unfair Labor Practices, which provides protection for employees not otherwise provided by an economic strike.

=== Scabby the Rat and WGAW rank-and-file ===
The WGSU erected an inflatable Scabby the Rat on the intersection of Third & Fairfax to protest the WGAW's use of strikebreaking labor, their bad faith bargaining, and their unfair labor practices. Industry trade magazines and newspapers took note of Scabby's presence outside of the Guild Headquarters, commenting on the irony that such a symbol was being weaponized against a labor union. Articles frequently featured photos of Scabby underneath the Writers Guild of America West façade.

The strike drew intense reactions from politicians as well as the film and labor industries. Writers, often wearing their trademark blue strike shirts, joined the picket line in support of the staff, and the picketers were further joined by community allies.

=== San Pedro offer ===
The WGSU requested that the WGAW management team bargain again amid the strike. The WGAW requested that the staff union source a "neutral location", and the two parties met at the union hall for the International Longshore and Warehouse Union (ILWU) Local 56 in San Pedro on February 22. The two sides were unable to come to terms, and the WGSU announced that the WGAW management team was still invested in surface bargaining. On the following Tuesday, February 24, WGAW management informed the staff union that they were holding to their previous proposal in San Pedro they would not be negotiating further. The WGSU quickly took to Instagram to inform the public and the media that the 78th Writers Guild of America Awards was under threat of cancellation.

=== Cancellation of the 2026 WGAW Awards Ceremony ===
2026 Writers Guild Awards L.A. Show is Cancelled [sic]
WGAW would not ask attendees to cross a picket line, as PNSWU [sic] strike continues.

— awards.wga.org

The WGSU refused to entertain the San Pedro offer. The deadline passed, and WGAW management announced the awards show's cancellation via their press room. They acknowledged that the WGSU would likely picket the event, and that they did not want to ask the nominees or other attendees to cross a picket line. WGSU members gave statements to the press, expressing sadness over the show's cancellation. Writers responded to the announced cancellation with frustration, citing it as an example of the losses incurred by Management's refusal to bargain in good faith.

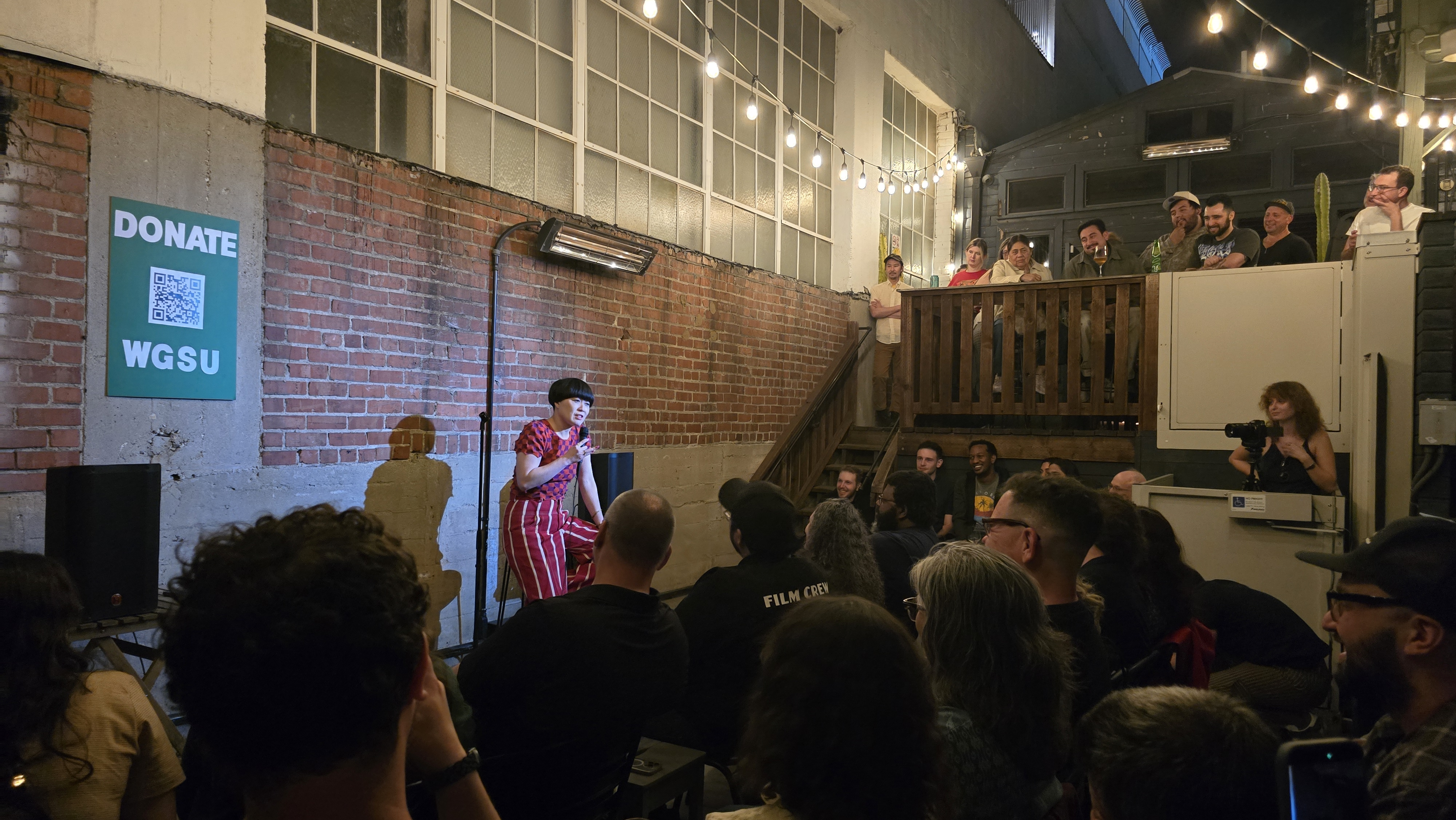
Okatsuka performs jokes intended for the cancelled 78th WGAW Awards for an audience of striking WGSU members and donors on Sunday, March 8, 2026

After the awards show cancellation, Atsuko Okatsuka, the comedian who had been chosen to host the 78th annual awards, announced on March 6 that she would be headlining a Benefit Comedy Show for the striking workers instead. In a quote to The Hollywood Reporter, Okatsuka said, "I'm a union girl... We're only as strong as the people behind the scenes!! We're one unit, so we must move as such. I was supposed to host the awards this Saturday. A day of celebrating the hard work of artists in one of the strongest unions in the U.S.. But could we really celebrate while the staff, who help support the union are asking to be heard of their needs? I'm honored to stand with them."

=== 2026 MBA negotiations cross the picket line ===
After abandoning the negotiating table with their staff, WGAW management announced that the staff would not see them at the table any longer, and that they would instead be focusing on negotiating the 2026 Minimum Basic Agreement (MBA) with the Association of Motion Picture and Television Producers (AMPTP). The staff, who would have otherwise been working the negotiations, discovered that the negotiations were to take place at SAG-AFTRA Plaza, on Wilshire Boulevard, not too far from the Writers Guild of America West Headquarters. The decision was made to move their picket line to SAG, and the union marched down Fairfax Avenue in protest of their management performing their labor while they were still on strike.

The WGAW Management team and the Negotiating Committee refused to speak with the striking workers on the picket line, and a daily standoff commenced, as high profile Writers Guild members on the negotiating committee crossed the staff picket line without regard to the protest or pleas for them to not do so. The 2026 Negotiating Committee included John August, Ali Barthwell, Stan Chervin, Josh Gondelman, Phil Hay, Shawn Ryan, Betsy Thomas, Erica Saleh, Mike Schur, Ben Watkins, and Lisa Zwerling among others. The Writers Guild of America, East also sent representatives to the MBA negotiations, who joined the WGAW negotiating committee at SAG-AFTRA Plaza. Many of these writers were outspoken activists during the 2023 writers' strike, but none of them chose to honor the WGSU picket line.

This led to a heated conflict between the WGSU on one side, and the WGA Management and Negotiating Committee on the other. At the parking lot exits, the picket lines held up vehicles long into the night hours. Because SAG-AFTRA Plaza is a multi-purpose office building, this led to disruptions as people not party to the labor dispute were held up when they tried to exit out of the parking lot after a negotiating committee member, who was being held up by the picket line. On March 25, a member of the public, unaffiliated with the WGA, threatened to kill one of the striking workers. When Sean Graham, WGAW General Council, was informed of this by the striking workers, his response was to tell the workers to "take the deal." “WGAW management does not value us,” the WGSU said in a statement on Instagram, “They do not care about our wellbeing or about our safety on the picket lines, which they have crossed every day this week.”

=== Wilshire standoff ===
In the following morning, the WGA Negotiating Committee and management joined into a group to march into SAG-AFTRA Plaza from neighboring Hancock Park. Video recorded by WGAW NegCom member Chris Hazzard and published by Variety showcased the resulting clash. As the WGA Negotiating Committee and Guild managers crossed Curson Street, WGSU members took notice and began to walk alongside them, shouting and using bullhorns, demanding that the group not cross their picket line, and that Ellen Stutzman return to their bargaining table. The two groups collided outside of the SAG-AFTRA Plaza entrance on Wilshire Boulevard, with WGA Negotiating Committee members and managers shoving their way past workers as they walked back and forth. They were met with chants of "Fair Contract!" "Shame!" and "Don't cross the picket line!" from the striking workers.

On April 28, long after the negotiations between the AMPTP and WGA concluded and the picket line returned to WGAW Headquarters, Negotiating Committee member John August, on his podcast Scriptnotes, with guest Ali Barthwell, revisited the experience of crossing the staff's picket line. They discussed that prior to negotiations, the NegCom had received phone calls from members of the staff union, asking them to get Stutzman to return to bargaining. Barthwell revealed that there was a lot of attempted contact from the staff union, 30 to 40 phone calls in a day, and 30 to 50 text messages in a day. Nevertheless, Barthwell did not respond nor attempt to communicate with the staff union prior to the conflict at SAG-AFTRA. August discussed that the WGA couldn't hold member meetings because those are typically run by staff who were on strike. Barthwell and August both expressed confusion and frustration for being targeted by the picketing workers, and accused the Staff Union of making them fearful of violence.

=== Management cuts healthcare ===
March 31, 2026, it was learned, and publicly shared, that WGSU striking staff members would lose their health insurance coverage the following day, as the strike entered its sixth week. The WGAW cited an administrative obstacle for the reason, and encouraged any employees who wanted to regain their healthcare to return to work.

== Reactions from public officials ==
The WGSU strike took place in the midst of the primary for the 2026 Los Angeles mayoral election and City Council elections. A letter, signed by City Councilmembers Eunisses Hernandez, Katy Yaroslavsky, Hugo Soto-Martinez, and Tim McOsker was sent to WGA-West leadership on March 12, expressing support for the staff on strike. Yaroslavsky represented District 13, which includes the Writers Guild of America West Headquarters. Reverend Rae Huang, who was contesting the mayorship of Los Angeles, visited the WGSU picket line and published an Instagram reel on April 3, interviewing the workers and expressing her support for the WGSU.

Councilmember Nithya Raman, who was also contesting the mayorship, elected not to sign the Councilmembers' letter of support nor visit the picket line. Comedian and Writers Guild of America West Board of Directors member Adam Conover defended Raman's decision in a series of Slack messages leaked to Instagram on May 7. Conover expressed that the strike was "incredibly contentious within the Hollywood community". He denigrated the idea of union staff organizing into their own unions, and described his own union's staff on strike as a "radicalized minority ... a fringe union that only organizes other union staffs". He further expressed that "basically everyone in Hollywood labor thinks they're insane except for a small minority of kool aid drinkers".

== Contract Settlement ==
The strike continued through April. On May 8th, a tentative agreement was announced, meaning the bargaining teams from WGSU and WGAW had agreed to a deal. On May 9th, the new collective bargaining agreement had been ratified by 89% of the vote. The strike lasted 82 days. The contract is set to expire in 2028, and Guild staff will receive 12% minimum raises by August 2027. The salary floor for Guild staff was raised from $43,000 to $57,000 at ratification of the contract.

== See also ==
- 1960 Writers Guild of America strike
- 1981 Writers Guild of America strike
- 1988 Writers Guild of America strike
- 2007–08 Writers Guild of America strike
  - Effect of the 2007–08 Writers Guild of America strike on television
- 2023 Writers Guild of America strike
