= The Gap (Pluribus) =

- Pluribus episode
- Carol and Zosia reunite after Carol had written "come back" on the street in front of her house.
- Episode no.: Season 1 Episode 7
- Directed by: Adam Bernstein
- Written by: Jenn Carroll
- Cinematography by: Paul Donachie
- Editing by: Chris McCaleb
- Original air date: December 12, 2025
- Running time: 46 minutes

Guest appearance
- Jesse Ramirez as Concerned Villager

Episode chronology
← Previous "HDP"	Next → "Charm Offensive"

"The Gap" is the seventh episode of the American post-apocalyptic science fiction television series Pluribus. The episode was written by co-executive producer Jenn Carroll, and directed by Adam Bernstein. It was released on Apple TV on December 12, 2025.

The series is set in Albuquerque, New Mexico, and follows author Carol Sturka, who is one of only thirteen people in the world immune to the effects of "the Joining", resulting from an extraterrestrial virus that had transformed the world's human population into a peaceful and content hive mind (the "Others"). In the episode, Carol allows herself to indulge in her isolation, while Manousos drives through South America in an attempt to reach her.

The episode received critical acclaim, with critics praising the performances, pacing, and cinematography.

Carlos Manuel Vesga submitted the episode to support his Emmy nomination for Outstanding Supporting Actor in a Drama Series.

== Plot ==
Leaving Las Vegas, Carol stops at a gas station. She uses the telephone there to call the Others to turn the pump on, and then decides to ask for a Gatorade drink as well. When the drone delivers it, she calls them to complain that it was not "ice-cold" as she requested and asks them to do better. She notices a fireworks display in the store and decides to take them with her. After filling the car, she drives off to Albuquerque.

Carol tries to find ways to entertain herself, such as lighting the fireworks, playing golf in a country club, relaxing in Jemez Springs, and visiting the Georgia O'Keeffe Museum. One night, she gets the Others to arrange a dinner at an expensive restaurant she attended with Helen for their anniversary.

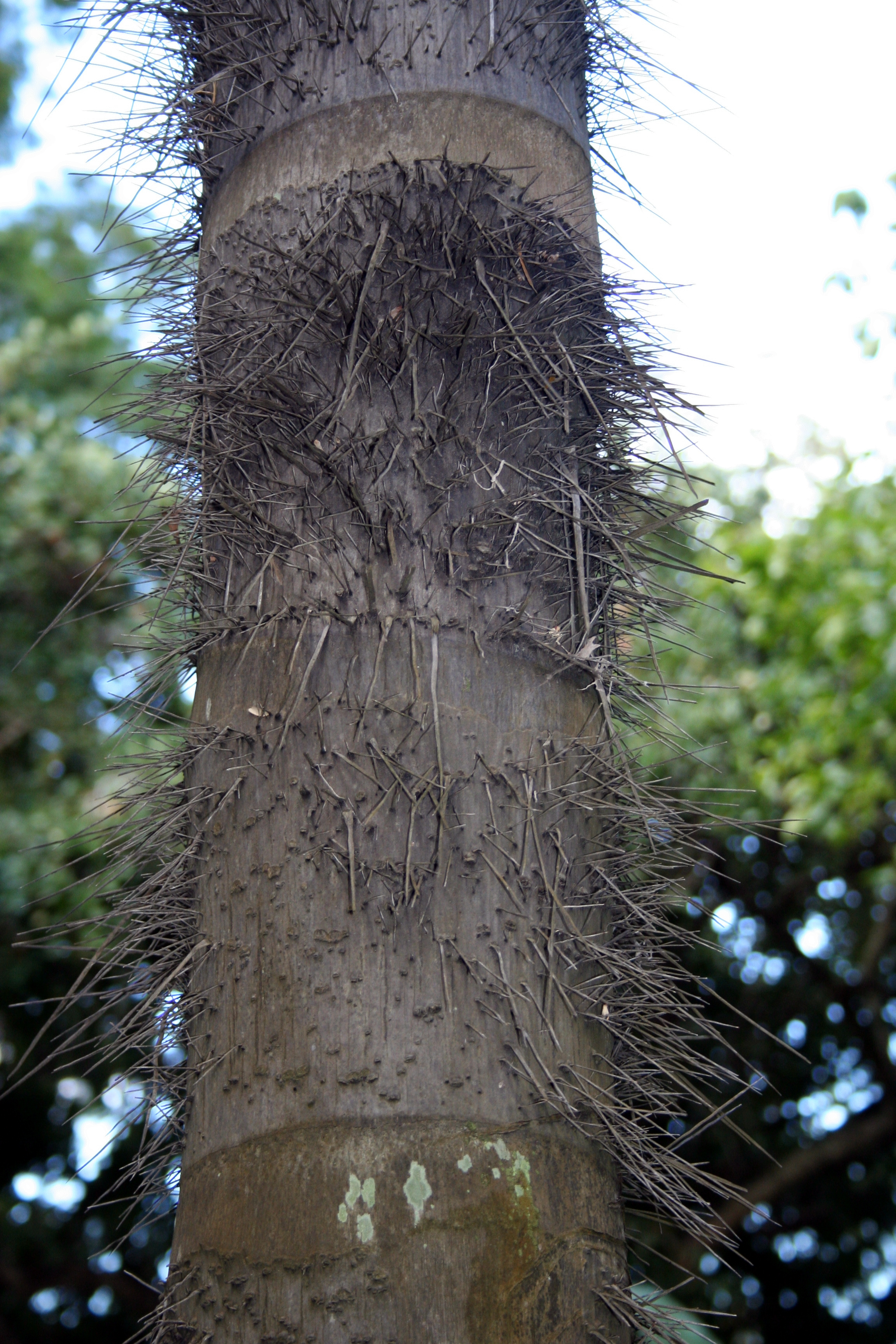
A chunga palm tree

In South America, Manousos attempts to drive across the continent to reach Carol in Albuquerque. He uses cassette tapes to learn English and refuses to let the Others help him with anything. He leaves cash behind whenever he picks up leftover supplies or siphons gas. Approaching the Darién Gap on the Colombia–Panama border, the road north ends, and Manousos gets ready to hike. A group of Others emerge and warn him not to continue, as the weather is severe, the terrain dangerous and he lacks resources. They suggest transporting him and his car directly to New Mexico instead. Manousos responds by setting his car on fire and continuing on foot alone - to him, anything the Others could offer him has been stolen. During his trek through the jungle, Manousos trips and is impaled on a chunga palm tree. Despite attempts to cauterize his wounds, he collapses and is rescued by the Others who reach him via helicopter.

Carol has grown depressed and despondent after roughly one month in isolation, but she continues trying to entertain herself. While drinking beer and shooting off fireworks in her cul-de-sac one night, a firework rocket accidentally tips over and aims directly at her. She notices, but does nothing about it, staring at it numbly until the fuse burns out. The rocket shoots and very narrowly misses her head, instead hitting a house behind her. She silently puts out the ensuing fire with a garden hose.

Some time later, Carol takes white paint and uses it to write "come back" on the street in front of her house. Shortly afterwards, Zosia arrives in a car. After a silent exchange, Carol hugs her, breaking down.

== Production ==
=== Development ===
The episode was written by co-executive producer Jenn Carroll, and directed by Adam Bernstein. This marked Carroll's first writing credit and Bernstein's first directing credit.

=== Writing ===
Carlos Manuel Vesga said that the episode displayed how Manousos does not want any help from the Others. "The more they know about him, the more he hates them. So when they say, 'We can transport your car for you. We know how important it is for you,' that enrages him even more. Like, 'How dare you know how much I love my car!' Everything that they can offer to him reminds him of loss, of what they took. Comparing him with Carol, Carol hates them, but still, she takes their help. This guy is like, 'No. Nothing. Nothing that you can offer. I'd rather eat dog food.'"

Rhea Seehorn said that series creator Vince Gilligan and director Bernstein helped her in seeing Carol's loneliness, which is what leads to her asking the Others to come back. "She could still eat and move around her house and watch TV, but it was an existential isolation where you have no idea if this will ever end, and that it broke her. It really broke her."

=== Production ===
Some locations in Albuquerque had been previously used for shots in Better Call Saul, including the Albuquerque Country Club and the Chaco, a high-scale restaurant. Though named, the show used a set as a stand-in for the Georgia O'Keeffe Museum, as Gilligan's crew had previously done during Breaking Bad. Additional filming was shot in the Jemez Mountains, about 50 miles from Albuquerque.

Some of the jungle scenes used for Manousos's trip were filmed on La Palma, part of the Canary Islands. Other scenes with Manousos were filmed in New Mexico, as they could not damage the flora nor set fire to Manousos's car at La Palma, and instead used a set in Albuquerque replicating the jungle setting, primarily for the close-up shots. To deal with the logistics and timing that would involve shipping Manousos's MG Midget across the Atlantic, they were able to have two replicas of the MG Midget used in the New Mexico shots created in Europe and used those for the jungle shots.

Gilligan expressed dismay when fans discovered satellite images through Google Earth which revealed the "come back" graffiti painted on the street of the cul-de-sac days before the episode aired.

== Reception ==
"The Gap" earned critical acclaim. Scott Collura of IGN gave the episode a "great" 8 out of 10 rating and wrote in his verdict, "'The Gap' brings Carol to her lowest point yet, as her abject loneliness has her actually craving the companionship of the Joined. Truly scary, and potentially worthy of another Twilight Zone reference too: “Number 12 Looks Just Like You.” Meanwhile, Manousos undergoes his own debilitating journey, albeit a more physical one, in a beautifully shot and acted episode."

Noel Murray of The A.V. Club gave the episode an "A" grade and wrote, "let's take a moment to appreciate the level of craft that went into 'The Gap.' Director Adam Bernstein and screenwriter Jenn Carroll are the credited creative team here, and they — along with the rest of the Pluribus crew — have adeptly handled a difficult challenge."

Scott Tobias of Vulture gave the episode a perfect 5 star rating out of 5 and wrote, "Presuming that she finally meets with poor Manousos face-to-face, it remains to be seen whether she'll be emboldened by a new (and thus far, only) ally or weakened by compromise. She may or may not be capable of saving humankind, but her vulnerability and need at the end of this episode makes her achingly human." Carly Lane of Collider gave the episode an 8 out of 10 rating and wrote, "When Vince Gilligan's Pluribus first premiered on Apple TV, it was anyone's guess what would happen; now, seven episodes in, we've definitely inched closer to answers to some of the biggest questions surrounding the sci-fi show's twisty premise."

Sean T. Collins of Decider wrote, "Pluribus makes life feel like the never-ending struggle it is, and it's damn good at it. I don't need the jokes and gags and bits. Just point the camera at two people slowly being driven insane by the fact that, for all intents and purposes, they are the only two people." Daniel Chin of The Ringer wrote, "on the heels of a revelatory trip to Las Vegas in last week's installment, Episode 7 sees her progress — as slow as it might have been — stall out. Rather than pushing Carol toward a resolution, Pluribus takes a step back to tell a tale of two survivors who are navigating the end of the world as best they can."

Josh Rosenberg of Esquire wrote, "Outside of Manousos's comments to the hive mind, episode 7 was a sparse and lonely time on planet Earth post-virus. And as Carol melts in Zosia's arms, she embraces what little is left of this empty world. There may not be a solution for Carol, Manousos, or anyone." Carissa Pavlica of TV Fanatic gave the episode a 3.75 star rating out of 5 and wrote, "So far, Pluribus has perfectly balanced the tone of the series, and I'm willing to ride that wave wherever it takes us."
