= Atsuko Okatsuka =

American stand-up comedian (born 1988)

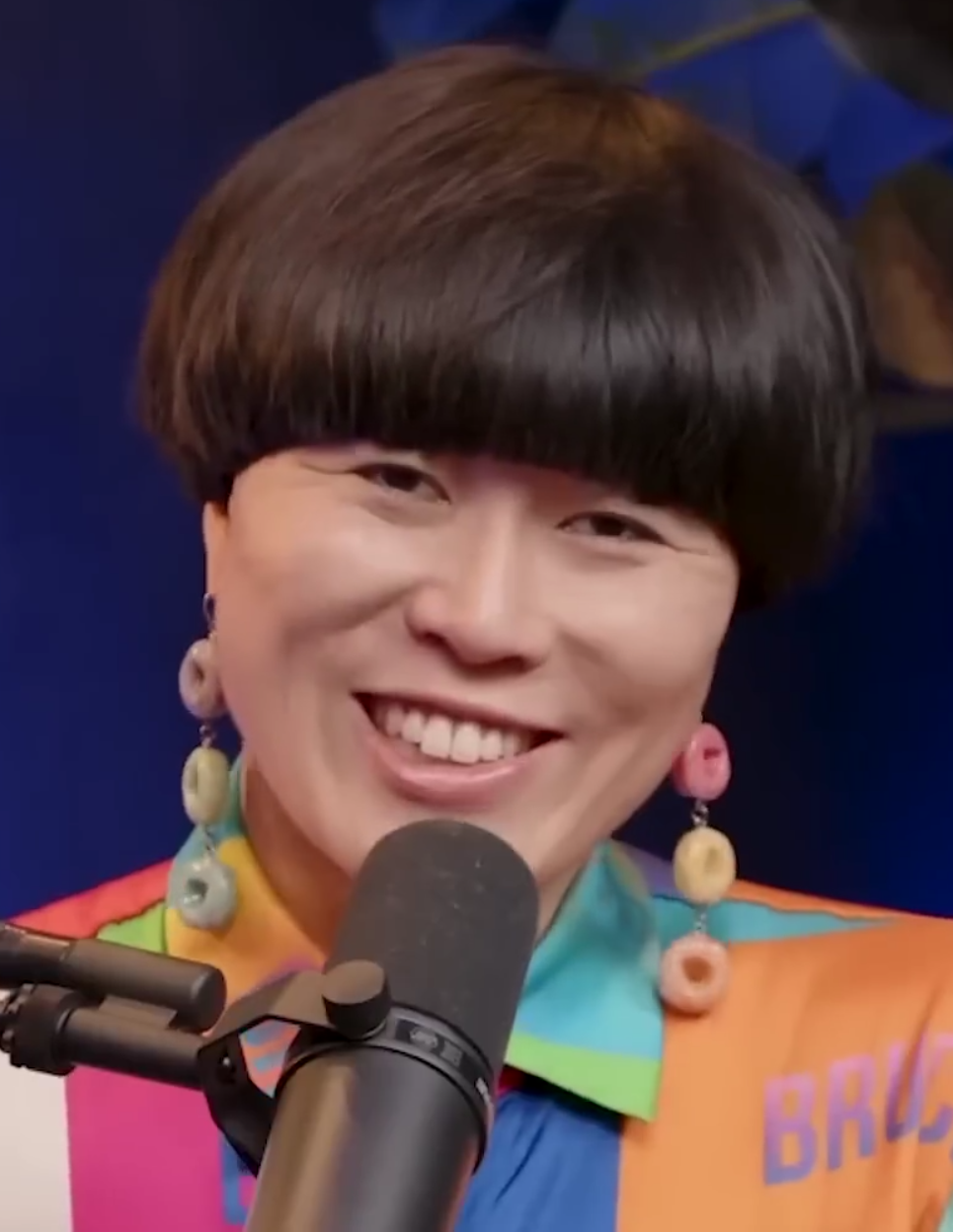
- Okatsuka in 2023
- Born: May 27, 1988 (age 38); Taiwan
- Citizenship: United States
- Spouse: Ryan Harper Gray (m. 2023)

Comedy career
- Years active: 2008–present
- Medium: Stand-up; podcasts; television; film
- Website: atsukocomedy.com

Atsuko Okatsuka (Note: (/ˈɑːtskoʊ oʊˈkɑːtskə/ AHT-skoh oh-KAHT-skə; Japanese: 岡塚 敦子, romanized: Okatsuka Atsuko; Chinese: 岡塚 敦子; pinyin: Gāngzhǒng Dūnzǐ; Pe̍h-ōe-jī: Kong-tsiong Ûn-tsú) (born May 27, 1988) is an American stand-up comedian, actress, and writer. She was named one of Variety's "Top 10 Comics to Watch" in 2022 and is the second Asian-American woman to have a standup special on HBO.

== Early life ==
Okatsuka was born in Taiwan on May 27, 1988, the daughter of a Taiwanese mother and Japanese father. She spent her early childhood in Japan. Her parents had met on a Japanese dating show and divorced when she was a child, in part due to her mother developing schizophrenia after giving birth. After the divorce, custody was given to Okatsuka's father, who lived in Chiba. She also has two older half-siblings from her father's first marriage. Her maternal grandfather was assassinated by the Kuomintang during the White Terror.

At the age of eight, Okatsuka was kidnapped by her maternal grandmother and taken to her mother in Los Angeles, where she lived for the next seven years as an undocumented immigrant in a room above her maternal uncle's garage. She has said that she used humor and outlandishness to get her mother's attention while growing up: "When she has the voices going in her head, she can't hear me. But if I can do something dramatic enough, she might hear me." She discovered standup comedy through a Margaret Cho DVD, given to her by a friend during a boring sermon at church. She has also mentioned watching comedians Lucille Ball, Charlie Chaplin, Buster Keaton, and Ken Shimura during her childhood.

Okatsuka attended Venice High School, where she was part of the cheerleading squad. She then studied psychology at the University of California, Riverside, before dropping out and later graduating from the California Institute of the Arts. While attending community college in Valencia, California, she found that her interest in comedy and performing was something that she wanted to pursue seriously:

I was never really good at school, but I always performed in some aspect throughout my life... whether it's dancing, cheerleading, theatre. When I was in community college I was like, "I like making people laugh. How do I take that and make that into a thing I can start doing?" At the time the only way I knew how to learn something was through the guidance of a class. I looked up stand-up comedy classes on Craigslist and found "Pretty Funny Women". It's an all women's stand-up class. At the time I signed up for the class, they were filming a documentary for it. I didn't have to start off just by going to open mics, which were pretty much dangerous if you were a woman. It still is now, but ten years ago, it was like walking into wolves. I still did it after the class was over, but I didn't have to start off that way, [about] which I feel lucky.

== Career ==
Okatsuka began doing stand-up in small clubs around Los Angeles.

In 2020, Okatsuka released her debut album with Comedy Dynamics, But I Control Me. She hosted and executive produced Let's Go Atsuko, for the now defunct Quibi. Paste said that her comedy style "has a childlike quality to it, with stage persona informed by a complex and challenging upbringing."

In 2019, Okatsuka performed a stand-up set during an earthquake at The Ice House comedy club in Pasadena, California, which went viral. She was commended for keeping the audience calm and serving quick-witted jokes while the earthquake went on. She made her late-night debut on The Late Late Show with James Corden on November 1, 2021, which was praised by Vulture as having "won late night" the week that it aired.

In February 2022, Okatsuka contributed original poems to Eating Salad Drunk, a comedian poetry anthology (edited by author Gabe Henry) that benefited Comedy Gives Back, a nonprofit supporting comedians facing financial hardship from the Covid-19 pandemic. In September 2022, Okatsuka, and Joel Kim Booster appeared together in the comedy special Life Is Beautiful Music & Art Festival.

Okatsuka started the viral Drop Challenge with her grandmother. She taught Chelsea Handler and Guillermo Rodriguez how to do her Drop Challenge as a guest on Jimmy Kimmel Live! in 2022.

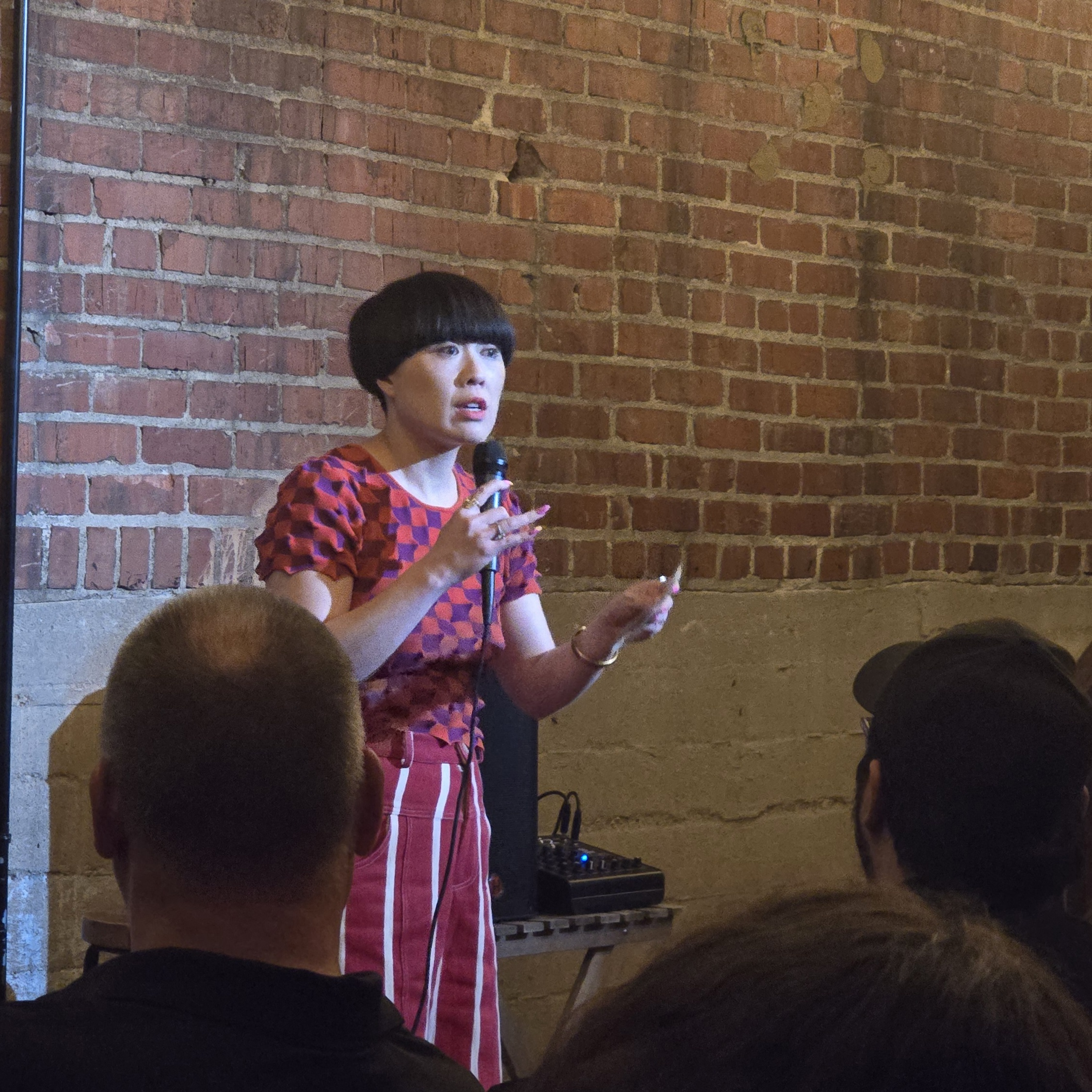
Okatsuka performing at a WGSU fundraiser in March 2026

On December 10, 2022, Okatsuka's debut stand-up special The Intruder premiered on HBO and HBO Max, which The New York Times named Best Debut of 2022, and Vulture listed as one of the Best Comedy Specials of 2022. The show won best comedy special at the Gracie Awards and Variety listed her in their 2023 Comedy Impact Report.

Okatsuka's life story of being kidnapped by her grandmother and brought to the U.S. was told on This American Life in September 2023 in an episode titled "The One Place I Can't Go". She was featured in Vanity Fair in the November 2023 issue, photographed by Mark Seliger, playing the quarterback of a made-up football team while wearing couture. She was profiled in PBS Newshour where she called the interviewer Amna Nawaz a "fellow weirdo" and said that performing for people means finding community. She was on the cover of New York Times Magazine with Margaret Cho where Margaret crowned Okatsuka as her heir to comedy. She appeared in Mike Birbiglia's documentary Good One: A Show About Jokes.

On June 13, 2025, Okatsuka released her second comedy special Father on Hulu, which was ranked #6 on Vulture's list of the best stand-up specials of 2025 and named one of the year's best by the Los Angeles Times. She appeared in the Apple TV+ comedy film Outcome, alongside Keanu Reeves and Jonah Hill, that was released in April of 2026.

== Personal life ==
Okatsuka married American actor and painter Ryan Harper Gray in 2023. They had a wedding ceremony in 2017, but discovered in 2023 that they had not filed the paperwork and were not legally married.

== Works ==
=== As writer ===
- 2018 – Soft Focus with Jena Friedman

=== Film ===
- 2017 – Discreet, Mandy
- 2023 – Spider-Man: Across the Spider-Verse, Yuri
- 2024 - All That We Love, Raven
- 2025 – Elio, Ambassador Naos
- 2026 – Outcome, Unis Kim
- 2027 - The Comeback King

=== Albums ===
- 2020 – But I Control Me

=== Specials ===
- 2022 – The Intruder - filmed at the Elsewhere Stage in Brooklyn, NY
- 2025 – Father - filmed at the El Capitan Theatre in Los Angeles, CA

=== Television ===
- 2022 – Fairview
- 2023 – History of the World: Part II
- 2024 – After Midnight
- 2024 – Good One: A Show About Jokes - Mike Birbiglia Documentary

=== Podcasts ===
- Why Won't You Date Me?, herself
- Trusty Hogs, herself
- Yo, Is This Racist?, herself
- Hollywood Handbook, herself
- The Margaret Cho, herself
- Natch Beaut, herself
- Sloppy Seconds, herself
- Alison Rosen Is Your New Best Friend, herself
- The Bechdel Cast, herself
- Pep Talks, herself
- Go Fact Yourself, herself
- I Said No Gifts, herself
- Don't Ask Tig, herself
- WTF with Marc Maron, herself
- Mike Birbiglia's Working It Out, herself
- Lovett or Leave It, herself
- Wait Wait... Don't Tell Me!, herself
- The Three Questions with Andy Richter, herself
- Busy Phillips Is Doing Her Best, herself
- Office Hours Live with Tim Heidecker, herself
- Las Culturistas, herself
- The Blocks Podcast, herself
- Funny cuz it's true, herself
- Fresh Air, herself
- Everything Is Alive, bagpipes
- Comedy Bang Bang, herself
- Sibling Rivalry, herself
- I Never Liked You, herself
