= Got Milk (Pluribus) =

- Pluribus episode
- Carol scours a garbage container as she investigates an excess of empty milk cartons.
- Episode no.: Season 1 Episode 5
- Directed by: Gordon Smith
- Written by: Ariel Levine
- Cinematography by: Paul Donachie
- Editing by: Joey Liew
- Original air date: November 26, 2025
- Running time: 46 minutes

Guest appearance
- Menik Gooneratne as Laxmi

Episode chronology
← Previous "Please, Carol"	Next → "HDP"

"Got Milk" is the fifth episode of the American post-apocalyptic science fiction television series Pluribus. The episode was written by executive story editor Ariel Levine and directed by Gordon Smith. It was released on Apple TV on November 26, 2025, airing two days earlier than usual due to the Thanksgiving holiday.

The series is set in Albuquerque, New Mexico, and follows author Carol Sturka, who is one of only thirteen people in the world immune to the effects of "the Joining", resulting from an extraterrestrial virus that had transformed the world's human population into a peaceful and content hive mind (the "Others"). In the episode, the Others decide to leave Albuquerque for an undefined time, leaving Carol alone to make her own findings.

The episode received highly positive reviews from critics, who praised the episode's cinematography, cliffhanger, and Rhea Seehorn's performance.

== Plot ==
As Carol waits for Zosia's recovery, she is called by Laxmi, one of the immune, who berates her for disrupting the Others. Carol decides to take a nap, during which the Others leave Albuquerque in an orderly fashion. When she awakens, Carol finds the hospital empty and sees the last of the departing vehicles from the rooftop. Over a voice message, she is informed that the Others need some space from her, but will still fulfill any requests she makes.

That night, Carol returns home and records a video to the other immune, explaining her discovery and asking for help. She calls the Others to pick up the video, make copies, translate them if necessary, and send them to her fellow survivors. The Others send in a drone to pick up the tape. Carol is awakened that night by wolves, who are digging through her garbage. When a drone is unable to pick up her garbage the next day due to its weight, she is forced to drop the garbage in other dumpsters in town. During this, she discovers a large number of empty milk cartons from a local dairy.

Carol checks the factory, discovering that, instead of milk, the dairy was producing a strange fluid created from a bagged crystalline substance. She records some of these findings with her camera, theorizing that they must be drinking it to sustain the hive mind. When the wolves return in the night and try to dig up Helen's body, Carol tries to use a shotgun from the police cruiser but is unable to properly unlatch it. Desperate, she crashes the cruiser into the backyard, scaring off the wolves.

The following morning, Carol cleans up the backyard and lays down heavy landscaping tiles to protect Helen's grave. She performs additional tests on the bagged substance, recording her observations in a video to the other immune. After finding a barcode on one of the bags, she traces its origin to a local food packaging plant. She explores the plant and discovers a large chilling room. When she lifts up a tarp she is left shocked by what is beneath.

== Production ==
=== Development ===
The episode was written by executive story editor Ariel Levine and directed by Gordon Smith. This marked Levine's first writing credit and Smith's second directing credit.

=== Writing ===
Vince Gilligan said that the hive mind has not stopped caring for Carol, but that her actions in the previous episode led to "splits" in the group. He considers this a "time out" for Carol, adding "They do it in an over-the-top way: Half a million people leave town. They can't lay hands on her. They would never lock her up. They love her too much. They can't do any of that, and they wouldn't want to if they could. But they can leave, so they do."

=== Casting ===
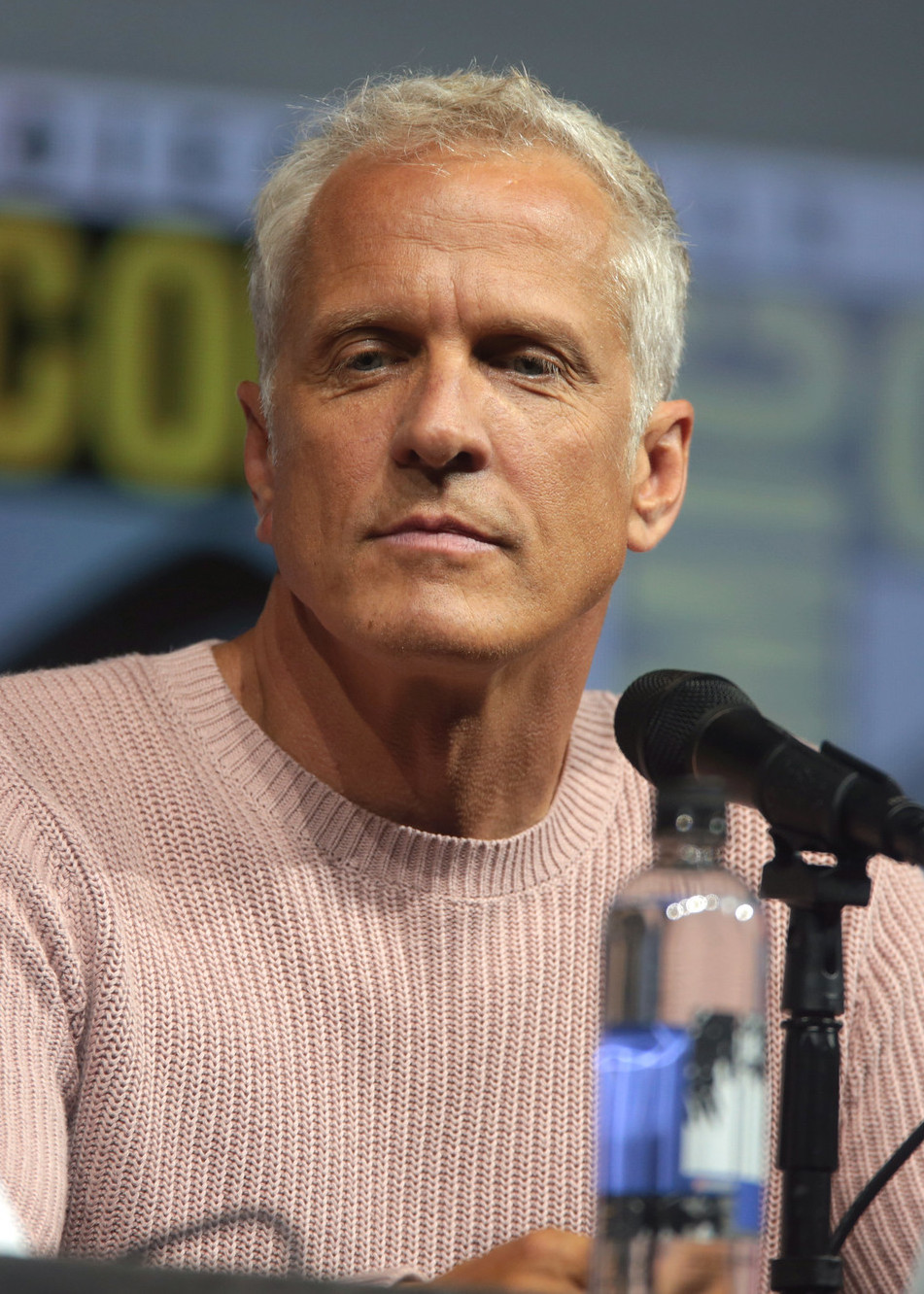
Patrick Fabian makes an uncredited voice cameo in the episode.

The episode features an uncredited voice appearance by Patrick Fabian, who previously worked with Gilligan and Rhea Seehorn in Better Call Saul, as the voice of the Others' prerecorded messages. Seehorn was not informed about Fabian's casting until she filmed the scene at the hospital, "They were hoping to get some kind of blooper take from me, but I was so terrified to mess up a take. Not terrified, but I just didn't want to — because I knew it was a long take, too, the first time she hears it." While she was surprised by hearing his voice, she stayed in character, and when the cameras stopped filming, she started laughing.

=== Production ===
According to executive producer and screenwriter Gordon Smith, they had originally planned for another director to lead "Got Milk", but due to the 2023 Writers Guild of America strike which occurred during the writing of the show and delayed production, that director was no longer available, and Smith stepped in to direct.

The shot of Carol watching numerous vehicles leave Albuquerque was done using special effects; Seehorn performed her role on a stage designed to match a hotel rooftop in the city, while a panning drone shot from that hotel roof was used for the backdrop in the scene, with most of the vehicles added through computer effects in post-production. Smith acknowledged it was likely one of the most expensive shots they shot for the show during its first season. Another shot with Carol working on placing tile over Helen's grave in the backyard against the setting sun was inspired by the scene in Raiders of the Lost Ark where Indiana Jones and his allies were digging up the Well of Souls.

== Reception ==
"Got Milk" earned highly positive reviews from critics. Scott Collura of IGN gave the episode a "great" 8 out of 10 rating and wrote in his verdict, "Pluribus continues to find interesting ways to explore age-old end-of-the-world tropes, mixing humor and tension to great effect while always relying on Rhea Seehorn's terrific take on Carol. Meanwhile, the mystery of what the Joined are really all about, and in particular at the moment what keeps them ticking, is a compelling thread that keeps the story moving forward while great set pieces like the wolf attack or exodus of the Joined play out."

Noel Murray of The A.V. Club gave the episode an "A–" grade and wrote, "Much as with last week's episode, the true cleverness of "Got Milk" comes not just from its wry gags but for how they fit together and push the plot forward. With no confirmation that anyone's listening or that anything she does matters, Carol begins relying on herself more, and the results are astonishing. I mean literally astonishing — as in Carol ends this episode with a look of astonishment on her face."

Scott Tobias of Vulture gave the episode a perfect 5 star rating out of 5 and wrote, "We'll see what the survivors make of this information — which they could well dismiss as a conspiratorial crackpot nonsense from a woman they don't like — but to close the episode on Carol literally gasping over the raw materials for this drink is a hell of a cliffhanger."

Sean T. Collins of Decider wrote, "this episode, my favorite so far, is powered by moments where the images do the talking. The rest is silence." Carly Lane of Collider gave the episode a 8 out of 10 rating and wrote, "'Got Milk' is also an episode that forces Seehorn to carry Pluribus on her shoulders for the bulk of the hour, and she does so in stunning fashion."

Josh Rosenberg of Esquire wrote, "Well, as Carol continues digging into their daily activities this week, she uncovers something far darker. Thanks to a cliff-hanger, the exact thing she discovers won't be revealed until we come back in December. (It's frustrating for now, but I'm excited.)" Carissa Pavlica of TV Fanatic gave the episode a 4 star rating out of 5 and wrote, "I connected with Pluribus Season 1 Episode 5 so much that I might as well have been sitting in Carol's living room with her, eating a frozen dinner, and yelling at coyotes."

=== Accolades ===
Award	Category	Nominee	Result	Ref.
Primetime Creative Arts Emmy Awards	Outstanding Picture Editing for a Drama Series	Joey Liew	Nominated	
Writers Guild of America Awards	Episodic Drama	Ariel Levine	Nominated	
