= Charm Offensive (Pluribus) =

- Pluribus episode
- Zosia and Carol at the diner
- Episode no.: Season 1 Episode 8
- Directed by: Melissa Bernstein
- Written by: Jonny Gomez
- Cinematography by: Marshall Adams
- Editing by: Skip Macdonald
- Original air date: December 19, 2025
- Running time: 43 minutes

Guest appearance
- Manoli Ioannidis as Doc Friendly

Episode chronology
← Previous "The Gap"	Next → "La Chica o El Mundo"

"Charm Offensive" is the eighth episode of the American post-apocalyptic science fiction television series Pluribus. The episode was written by Jonny Gomez, and directed by Melissa Bernstein. It was released on Apple TV on December 19, 2025.

The series is set in Albuquerque, New Mexico, and follows author Carol Sturka, who is one of only thirteen people in the world immune to the effects of "the Joining", resulting from an extraterrestrial virus that had transformed the world's human population into a peaceful and content hive mind (the "Others"). In the episode, Carol and Zosia spend time together, while Manousos forges on despite his injuries.

The episode received highly positive reviews from critics, who praised the dynamic between Carol and Zosia in the episode.

Karolina Wydra submitted the episode to support her Emmy nomination for Outstanding Supporting Actress in a Drama Series.

== Plot ==
Manousos wakes up in a Panamanian hospital, tended by the Others. Despite the Others' caution that he still needs time to recover, he forcefully demands to pay his hospital bill before driving away in an ambulance.

In Albuquerque, Carol spends several days with Zosia enjoying simple pleasures as the rest of the Others slowly return to the city, during which Carol tries to learn more about the hive mind. When Carol expresses curiosity over how the Others operate, Zosia shows her that the Others live and sleep in groups in large buildings; though initially wanting to return home to sleep, Carol spends the night with Zosia and the others in an arena. During a spa session the next day, Carol asks Zosia if every member of the hive mind feels the exact thing as Zosia. Zosia remarks that while they share the same consciousness and have an awareness of all experiences, they are unable to truly feel what each individual feels at once. That night, Zosia shows Carol the origin of the alien signal, the exoplanet Kepler-22b, 640 light-years away, and the Others' plan to build a giant antenna to transmit their signal to other planets. When alone, Carol maintains her list of facts she has learned about the Others on a whiteboard.

The next day, Zosia takes Carol to a diner with connections to Carol's early writing career. Though Carol is initially pleased to relive memories of the past, she realizes that the Others had completely rebuilt the diner from scratch just for her as the original had burned down years before, and populated it with people who had left the place behind long ago. She abruptly leaves and returns home alone. When Zosia arrives later, Carol complains that the situation with the Others is unsustainable, as she knows the hive mind is attempting to distract her from pursuing a solution to undo the Joining. Zosia suddenly kisses Carol and they sleep together. The next morning, Carol produces the first chapter of the next Winds of Wycaro book, offering it to Zosia to read. She asks to learn about the opinions and interests of Zosia as an individual before the Joining.

Several days pass, with Zosia staying with Carol. As they make breakfast one morning, Zosia tells Carol that a visitor is coming; Manousos is seen approaching the Mexico–U.S. border.

== Production ==
=== Development ===
The episode was written by Jonny Gomez, and directed by Melissa Bernstein. This marked Gomez's first writing credit and Bernstein's first directing credit.

=== Writing ===
Rhea Seehorn said that whether Carol first kissed Zosia or not was not important, explaining, "Am I just gonna keep swimming against the current until I'm just dead? She's really suffering with the options she has left, and this one seems like the way to go, and at least have some kind of peace, instead of just raging against the machine." She also said, "[Carol] has real affection for this person at this point, even though she is terrified that there's nothing real about it." Karolina Wydra said, "That whole episode for me, and for Carol and Zosia, is such a big episode because of that. Are they being manipulative because they're trying to distract Carol? Or is it that they genuinely care about her, and want to make her happy, and get her to see the goodness of what they have, and maybe join them willingly?"

Regarding the plans of the Others in the episode, Alison Tatlock explained, "It seems like spreading the good word is the most important thing to them. But I wouldn't say it's the only thing, because they seem genuinely dedicated to the comfort of the leftover people that they're helping to care for. So that is also something they care about. The most important thing to them is their biological imperative to survive and expand. But they care about the Earth."

== Reception ==
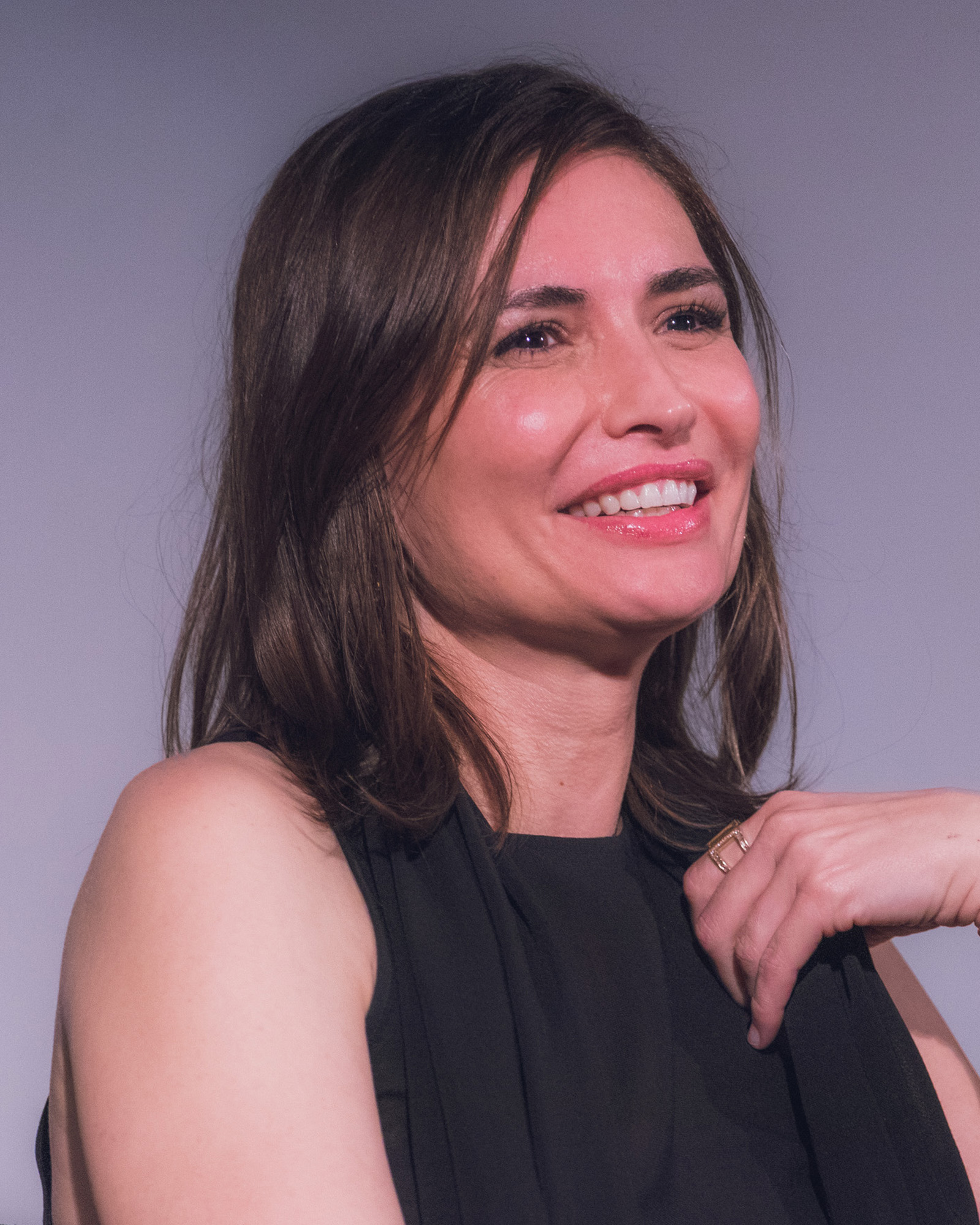
Karolina Wydra's performance as well as the scenes between her character and Carol in the episode was praised by critics.

"Charm Offensive" earned highly positive reviews from critics. Scott Collura of IGN gave the episode a "good" 7 out of 10 rating and wrote in his verdict, "At the second-to-last episode of Pluribus Season 1, Carol Sturka stands at a crossroads. She knows that the Others/Joined represent the end of humankind as we know it, but she's also at a loss as to how to fix the situation... and she's so darned alone. 'Charm Offensive' goes a long way towards filling in some information about how the infected operate and what their bigger plan is, but it also keeps us guessing about what's really going on with Carol... and where she might wind up."

Noel Murray of The A.V. Club gave the episode an "A–" grade and wrote, "For those of you who become impatient whenever Pluribus episodes feature little to no dialogue, this week's 'Charm Offensive' should be more your speed. It has words aplenty, spilling out of both Carol and Zosia, who spend a few days together, chatting away like people on a first date. Which they kind of are... if you consider Zosia a person."

Scott Tobias of Vulture gave the episode a perfect 5 star rating out of 5 and wrote, "One great thing about 'Charm Offensive' is how well it emphasizes that Carol's feelings for Zosia and the Others isn't strictly on the latter end of a love-them-or-hate-them binary. As much as she has committed to her campaign of resistance, she's not as rigorous about it as Manousos, which may be compromising in many respects but brings true complexity to her relationship with Zosia." Carly Lane of Collider gave the episode an 9 out of 10 rating and wrote, "Their reconciliation and the fun outings that ensue all culminate, so to speak, in a moment between Carol and Zosia that some fans may have inwardly been rooting for, but still has massive implications heading into the finale next week."

Sean T. Collins of Decider wrote, "Here's a woman who went for over a month without human contact of any kind, and who hasn't been lovingly touched since her wife died in her arms during the apocalypse. Finally being passionately embraced must feel like dying and being reborn." Daniel Chin of The Ringer wrote, "The series has dedicated its recent episodes to developing its leading characters while also establishing the Others' evolving, eerie tactics to win over the last of humanity's holdouts against a fully Joined world. Before we reach the wait that lies ahead of Season 2, Pluribus has one last opportunity to show us where this mystery is heading."

Josh Rosenberg of Esquire wrote, "The hive mind might believe that they have a purpose: to spread their genetic code and expand their collective reach. Hell, all living beings on Earth have a natural imperative to reproduce. But what does it all mean? Much like anything we learned this episode, the hive mind is simply an answer that leads to even more questions. At the aliens' very core, they know as much as we do." Carissa Pavlica of TV Fanatic gave the episode a 4.7 star rating out of 5 and wrote, "[Carol is] starved for interaction, and she can find common ground and much to enjoy about those around her, even if she doesn't agree with them. It’s pretty much my life's mission statement, and seeing it unfold so beautifully on 'Charm Offensive' gave me hope for the real world."

=== Accolades ===
TVLine named Karolina Wydra the "Performer of the Week" for the week of December 20, 2025, for her performance in the episode. The website wrote: "Wydra's face lit up as Zosia remembered getting a sweet taste of that ice cream as a child, the sense memory dancing in her eyes — and for a moment, we could see the old Zosia peeking out from behind the hive mind. We know that Zosia is just one of seven billion minds sharing a collective consciousness, but through her masterful work, Wydra has still managed to make her unique... and fascinating."

Award	Category	Nominee	Result	Ref.
Writers Guild of America Awards	Episodic Drama	Jonny Gomez	Nominated	
