= Lizzie O'Leary =

American journalist

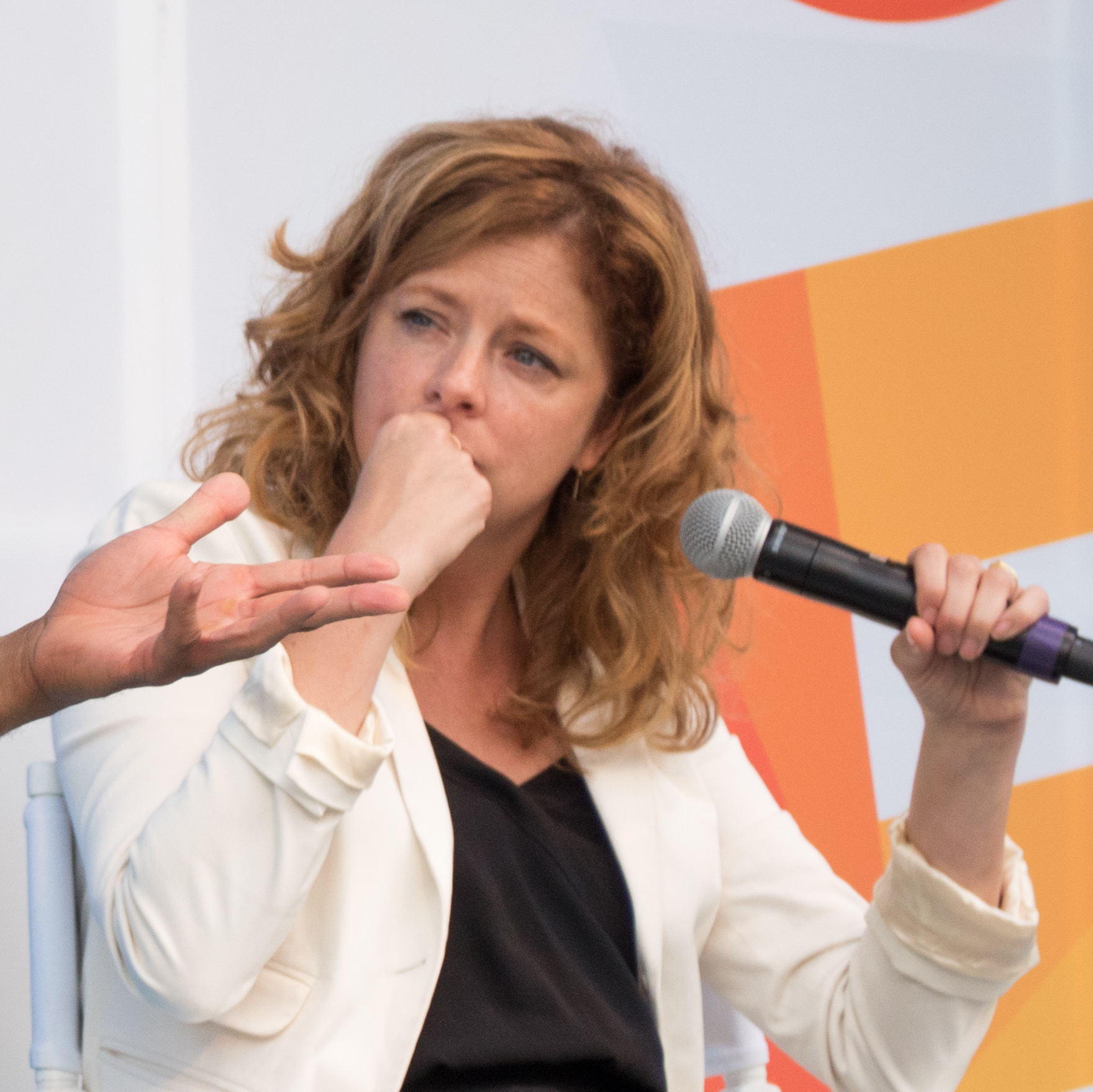
- O'Leary in 2018
- Education: Williams College, Columbia University
- Occupation: Journalist

Lizzie O'Leary is an American journalist. She has worked with CNN, NPR, Bloomberg TV, Yahoo News, ABC and the BBC. She holds degrees from Columbia University and Williams College. She was the host of Marketplace Weekend until the end of its run in mid 2018. She currently hosts the weekly What Next: TBD podcast for Slate.

== Education ==
O'Leary graduated cum laude from Williams College with degrees in English and Art History. She went on to graduate from the Columbia University Graduate School of Journalism in 2003.

== Career ==
O'Leary began her career with ABC as a member of a team including Diane Sawyer, Charles Gibson, and Peter Jennings, which won a Peabody Award for reporting on the September 11th terrorist attacks. She worked for NPR from 2003 to 2006, before moving to Bloomberg TV, where she covered politics and economic policy. She then joined CNN in 2012 as an aviation and regulation correspondent.

O'Leary suffered most of her life from symptoms of endometriosis, which she was eventually diagnosed with at the age of 37. Related complications resulted in her decision to leave CNN in 2013. She joined Marketplace later in 2013 as a fill-in host, where she helped launch Marketplace Weekend, which she hosted for four years.
