= Amber J. Lawson =

American film producer

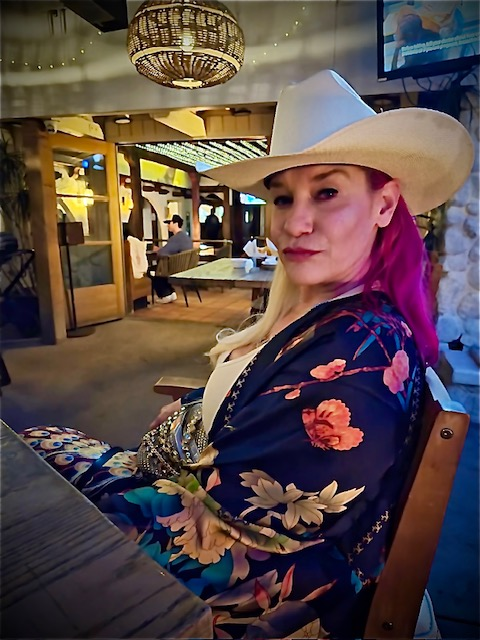
- Born: Kansas City, Missouri
- Education: The Second City; University of Missouri
- Occupations: Entrepreneur, Online Content and Development Executive, Producer
- Organization(s): IAWTV Awards; Chairman, Academy of Television Arts & Sciences Interactive Media Peer Group
- Board member of: OpenSlate Studios, Social Media Week LA, Picture Healing, Attention Span Media

Amber J. Lawson (born August 24, 1972) is an American media executive, entrepreneur, transformational coach, and nonprofit co-founder.

Over a career spanning more than two decades, she has held executive roles at National Lampoon, ManiaTV, Babelgum, and AOL, and served as Chairman of the Interactive Media Peer Membership Working Group for the Academy of Television Arts & Sciences.

She is a co-founder of Comedy Gives Back, a nonprofit organization providing financial assistance and mental health support to professional comedians, and the founder and CEO of Good Amplified, a digital media initiative supporting nonprofits on YouTube.

She holds a doctorate in Transformational Facilitation from MITT (Mastery in Transformational Training). In the 2020s, Lawson expanded her work to include live touring shows and coaching programs focused on midlife reinvention for women, including Grown Ass Woman Live and the SPARCC coaching methodology.

== Early life ==
Lawson was born in Kansas City, Missouri, and grew up in Raytown, Missouri, where she attended Raytown South High School. She earned a Bachelor of Arts in Theatrical Performance from the University of Missouri. She later completed Ph.D in Transformational Facilitation at MITT (Mastery in Transformational Training), under the direction of Professor Michael Strassner.

== Career ==
=== Early career and digital media (1999–2009) ===
After relocating to Los Angeles, Lawson founded internetworksstudios.com in 1999, developing online content including Pop Girl, a talent competition format. In 2000, the company was renamed Stage 3 Studios, focusing on film and television programming. Under Stage 3 Studios, Lawson adapted Pop Girl into a one-hour dramedy titled Alyx and worked with Madonna, Maverick Productions and Touchstone/ ABC.

In 2006, Lawson and collaborator Jay Leggett (In Living Color)created Comedy Cocktail, a live sketch comedy show in Los Angeles credited with launching the careers of Ask A Ninja and Frangela, and producing Super Seniors, an early precursor to Comedy Central's Workaholics. That same year,the duo was hired by National Lampoon to relaunch the National Lampoon Lemmings live tour and oversee its comedy album releases.In 2007, Lawson joined ManiaTV, followed by a position at Babelgum beginning in 2009, where she served as comedy publisher and created several viral series including Kids Reenact, In 60 Seconds, and Kevin Pollak's Vamped Out.

=== AOL and Television Academy (2010–2012) ===
In 2010, Lawson was recruited by AOL to serve as Vice President and Head of Video Programming, a newly created position.

During this period she was also appointed Chairman of the Interactive Media Peer Membership Working Group for the Academy of Television Arts & Sciences, and served as IAWTV Awards Chairman for the International Academy of Web Television. She was a founding partner of StoryTech, a Los Angeles-based brand and technology consultancy, in 2011. She has served as a featured speaker at NAB, CES, SXSW, NATPE, Digital Hollywood, Just For Laughs Comedy Festival, and other industry conferences.

=== Good Amplified (2014–present) ===
Lawson is the founder and CEO of Good Amplified, a digital media initiative she launched to help nonprofit organizations build audience, advocacy, and revenue through YouTube strategy. Good Amplified developed one of the first multi-channel network (MCN) models focused exclusively on nonprofit video content. The initiative worked with clients including Make-A-Wish Foundation and Teen Cancer America, executing influencer collaboration campaigns and YouTube-based fundraising activations.

=== Grown Ass Woman Live and Coaching Work (2020s–present) ===
In 2018 Lawson started coaching Olympians, CEO's, career moms and bagan developing her woman focused SPARCC (formally known as Goddess Process) In the early 2020s, Lawson developed Grown Ass Woman Live, an interactive live touring show for women focused on the 3D's Deprogramming, Discovering and Doing It a personal reinvention in midlife. The show combines audience participation with comedy-inflected discussion and has toured multiple cities. She also developed the Grown Ass Woman SPARCC methodology and the Grown Ass Woman brand of workshops, live events, and digital programming focused on women in their 40s, 50s, and 60s. Her television appearances include a segment on The Kelly Clarkson Show. She appeared on a panel for the Television Academy during the COVID-19 period titled Creative Disruption in the Time of Corona.

=== Comedy Gives Back ===
Comedy Gives Back is a nonprofit organization co-founded in 2011 by Lawson, Jodi Lieberman, and Zoe Friedman, originally operating under the name Transforming the World Through Comedy. The organization produced benefit events, livestream programming, and fundraising campaigns to provide financial assistance and mental health support for professional comedians. Its inaugural event on November 16, 2011, featured performances from Gotham Comedy Club in New York, Zanies Comedy Club in Chicago, and The Improv in Los Angeles, with participants including Dane Cook, Kevin Nealon, Adam Carolla, Adam Devine, Marc Maron, Reggie Watts, and others. Subsequent annual events benefited organizations including Malaria No More and Feeding America.In 2020, the organization was recognized in Variety in connection with COVID-19 pandemic relief efforts for comedians, including the Comedy Gives Back Laugh Aid fundraising initiative. Subsequent programming has included the Alt Comedy All Stars Benefit Show anchored by Mr. Show’s Bob Odenkirk, David Cross, Jon Hamm and Patton Oswalt, held annually 2024, 2025 and 2026. The organization also produced the Very Good Person year-end giving campaign in 2025.Comedy Gives Back has been cited in tribute programming connected to comedian Richard Lewis, with a tribute event scheduled for November 15, 2026.

=== Awards and recognition ===
Lawson has received recognition across the entertainment, digital media, and comedy industries. She has been nominated for an Emmy Award and received a Cynopsis Media Entrepreneur of the Year designation. She has been named to Variety's Comedy Impact Report on two occasions, in 2020 and 2025. Additional recognition includes a Producers Guild of America Digital recognition and NATPE Luminary Award. In 2021, Los Angeles officially declared August 18 as Brody Stevens Day, an initiative in which Comedy Gives Back participated in tribute to comedian Brody Stevens. In 2018, she was named Top 100 people in marketing.
