= Say My Name (disambiguation) =

"Say My Name" is a song by the American girl group Destiny's Child.

Say My Name may also refer to:

== Music ==
- Say My Name, a South Korean girl group formed in 2024

=== Albums ===
- Say My Name (Hyolyn EP), 2020
- Say My Name (Say My Name EP), 2024
- Say My Name, 2011 EP by Faydee and its title track

=== Songs ===
- "Say My Name" (David Guetta, Bebe Rexha and J Balvin song), 2018
- "Say My Name" (Peking Duk song), 2015
- "Say My Name" (Tove Styrke song), 2017
- "Spectrum (Say My Name)", by Florence + the Machine, 2011
- "Say My Name", by Ateez, 2019
- "Say My Name", by Austin Mahone, 2014
- "Say My Name", from the stage musical Beetlejuice
- "Say My Name", by Digital Farm Animals featuring Iman, 2018
- "Say My Name", by JBJ, 2017
- "Say My Name", by The Lathums, 2022
- "Say My Name", by Lil Yachty, 2017
- "Say My Name", by Odesza featuring Zyra, 2014
- "Say My Name", by Porter Robinson, 2010
- "Say My Name", by Within Temptation, 2005

== Other uses ==
- "Say My Name" (Breaking Bad), an episode of the television series Breaking Bad
  - Faking Bad (musical), a Breaking Bad-inspired musical previously known as Say My Name!
- Say My Name (film), a 2018 film starring Lisa Brenner and Nick Blood
- Say My Name, a novel by Allegra Huston
