= Slippin' Jimmy =

American animated short-form comedy series

- Promotional poster
- Genre: Comedy
- Based on: Better Call Saul by: Vince Gilligan; Peter Gould
- Written by: Ariel Levine; Kathleen Williams-Foshee
- Directed by: Zac Palladino
- Voices of: Sean Giambrone; Kyle S. More; Will Vought
- Country of origin: United States
- Original language: English
- No. of seasons: 1
- No. of episodes: 6

Production
- Executive producers: Peter Gould; Melissa Bernstein; Gordon Smith; Ariel Levine; Kathleen Williams-Foshee; James A. Fino
- Producer: Jenny Mika
- Animator: Starburns Industries
- Running time: 8–9 minutes
- Production companies: AMC Networks Content Room; Starburns Industries

Original release
- Network: AMC+
- Release: May 23, 2022

Related
- Better Call Saul Breaking Bad

Better Call Saul Presents: Slippin' Jimmy, more commonly known as Slippin' Jimmy, is an American animated short-form series and a spin-off of Better Call Saul (itself a spin-off of Breaking Bad). The series follows a young Jimmy McGill's misadventures in Cicero, Illinois with his best friend Marco Pasternak. The show's release on AMC+ was set to coincide with the release of the final episode of the first half of Better Call Saul's sixth season.

== Production ==
=== Development ===
Variety reported in March 2021 that AMC was developing an animated spinoff series of Better Call Saul, titled Slippin' Jimmy. The series, a prequel based on younger Jimmy's time in Cicero, was developed by Ariel Levine and Kathleen Williams-Foshee, who previously worked on the associated live-action web series. Voice actors include Chi McBride, Laraine Newman, and Sean Giambrone as Jimmy.

Slippin' Jimmy was later revealed as a short-form series on February 10, 2022, along with the next season of the Better Call Saul Employee Training Video series and Cooper's Bar starring Rhea Seehorn. Told in the style of classic 1970s-era cartoons, each episode is an ode to a specific movie genre—from Spaghetti Westerns and Buster Keaton to The Exorcist. The series was produced by Starburns Industries and written by Levine and Williams-Foshee.

=== Release ===
The first teaser clip was released on February 10, 2022, when the series was officially unveiled. A release date was announced to occur during the sixth season of Better Call Saul. All six episodes of Slippin' Jimmy were released on May 23, 2022, on AMC+ to coincide with the release of Better Call Saul's mid-season six finale "Plan and Execution".

== Cast ==
=== Starring ===
- Sean Giambrone as Jimmy McGill
- Kyle S. More as Marco Pasternak
- Will Vought as Trent Titweiler

=== Recurring ===
- Beth Grant as Ms. Retch & Mrs. Brockfrater
- Jasmine Gatewood as Bobbi & Sue
- Chi McBride as Father Karras
- Gideon Adlon as Dawn Marie
- Gary Anthony Williams as Demon
- Laraine Newman as Sister Beth
- Carlos Alazraqui as Cheech & Comic Store Worker
- Brian Sommer as Radio Host & Taxi Driver
- Zac Palladino as Trent's Mom
- David Herman (additional voices)

== Episodes ==
No. overall	Title	Original release date
1	"Fistful of Snowballs"	May 23, 2022
Jimmy battles Trent and his friends in a snowball fight to rescue Marco.
2	"The Exor-sister"	May 23, 2022
In detention, Jimmy and Marco must save Sister Beth when she is possessed by a demon.
3	"After Bedtime"	May 23, 2022
Jimmy and Marco sneak out at night to visit the comic shop, but run into Trent and his gang of bullies along the way.
4	"City Flights"	May 23, 2022
Jimmy buys a gramophone for his brother Chuck and faces many obstacles, including an angry policeman and dangerous trains, on his way home.
5	"Speed Date"	May 23, 2022
On the school bus, Jimmy and Trent race each other to ask out Dawn Marie to the dance.
6	"Cool Hand Jimmy"	May 23, 2022
Marco narrates how he met Jimmy at a summer camp and the origin of their friendship.

== Reception ==
Slippin' Jimmy was poorly received. Noah Villaverde of /Film considered Slippin' Jimmy non-canonical to the Breaking Bad universe and a blemish on the franchise, stating the humor "fails to land in every way" and "the decision to use childish comedy pandering to a demographic that's unlikely to catch your series due to its inseparable ties to a prestige adult drama is so baffling that one wonders how this entire production got greenlit in the first place". Alex Ashbrook from Comic Book Resources said the series is "crudely drawn and seems to have been hastily put together compared to how beautifully crafted its predecessors were. Despite Peter Gould appearing as an executive director, his skills are nowhere to be found." Mark Donaldson from Screen Rant criticized the concept, saying "the animated spinoff is being sold as a digital exclusive but this race to provide sellable content to audiences undermines storytelling ... the team behind both Breaking Bad and Better Call Saul have proven themselves to be savvy storytellers that respect the journeys of their characters over cheap cash-ins. It's this integrity that makes Slippin' Jimmy feel like such a misstep."
