= Breaking Bad (franchise) =

Neo-Western crime media franchise

- Created by: Vince Gilligan
- Original work: Breaking Bad (2008–2013)
- Owner: Sony Pictures Television
- Years: 2008–2022

Films and television
- Film: El Camino: A Breaking Bad Movie (2019)
- Television series: Breaking Bad; Better Call Saul (2015–2022)

Games
- Video game: Breaking Bad: Criminal Elements (2019)

Audio
- Original music: "Negro y Azul" by Los Cuates de Sinaloa; Dave Porter; Little Barrie

Miscellaneous
- Talk shows: Talking Bad (2013); Talking Saul (2016–2022)
- Animated short-form series: Slippin' Jimmy (2022)
- Adaptations: Metástasis (2014); Faking Bad (2018)

Breaking Bad is an American neo-Western crime media franchise created by Vince Gilligan, primarily based on the two television series, Breaking Bad (2008–2013) and Better Call Saul (2015–2022), and the film El Camino: A Breaking Bad Movie (2019). The fictional universe is sometimes informally referred to as the "Gilliverse".

Breaking Bad revolves around chemistry teacher-turned-methamphetamine drug lord Walter White (Bryan Cranston) and his former student and fellow crook Jesse Pinkman (Aaron Paul). Better Call Saul, the prequel/sequel series, follows the origins and eventual fate of criminal lawyer Jimmy McGill/Saul Goodman (Bob Odenkirk), whom Walter and Jesse eventually hire in Breaking Bad, as well as police officer-turned-criminal and cleaner Mike Ehrmantraut (Jonathan Banks), who becomes associated with all three men over the course of both series. El Camino: A Breaking Bad Movie, the sequel film, concludes the story of Jesse, now a fugitive, after the events of Breaking Bad. Gilligan said he felt the three works can be seen independently from one another, but exist in the same framework and need to be viewed together to receive the full cumulative experience.

The two television series and the film are set in Albuquerque, New Mexico, and give a modernized twist to Westerns set in the region. Each of the three entries were produced at Albuquerque Studios and emboldened success for the media in the city and film in the state. Both series originally aired on AMC, while the film premiered on Netflix, on which the two television series aired internationally (outside of United States). The franchise is owned by Sony Pictures Television and received strong critical acclaim; numerous awards were given to Breaking Bad, to Better Call Saul, and to El Camino.

The Breaking Bad franchise has since expanded across several different mediums and multimedia platforms, with varying degrees of contributions from its cast and crew. This includes the talk shows Talking Bad (2013) and Talking Saul (2016–2022), the Spanish-language adaptation Metástasis (2014), the parody musical Faking Bad (2018), and the animated short-form series Slippin' Jimmy (2022).

== Television series ==
Series	Season	Episodes		Originally released		Showrunner(s)
Series	Season	Episodes		First released	Last released	Showrunner(s)
Breaking Bad	1	7		January 20, 2008	March 9, 2008	Vince Gilligan
Breaking Bad	2	13		March 8, 2009	May 31, 2009	Vince Gilligan
Breaking Bad	3	13		March 21, 2010	June 13, 2010	Vince Gilligan
Breaking Bad	4	13		July 17, 2011	October 9, 2011	Vince Gilligan
Breaking Bad	5	16	8	July 15, 2012	September 2, 2012	Vince Gilligan
Breaking Bad	5	16	8	August 11, 2013	September 29, 2013	Vince Gilligan
Better Call Saul	1	10		February 8, 2015	April 6, 2015	Vince Gilligan and Peter Gould
Better Call Saul	2	10		February 15, 2016	April 18, 2016	Vince Gilligan and Peter Gould
Better Call Saul	3	10		April 10, 2017	June 19, 2017	Vince Gilligan and Peter Gould
Better Call Saul	4	10		August 6, 2018	October 8, 2018	Peter Gould
Better Call Saul	5	10		February 23, 2020	April 20, 2020	Peter Gould
Better Call Saul	6	13	7	April 18, 2022	May 23, 2022	Peter Gould
Better Call Saul	6	13	6	July 11, 2022	August 15, 2022	Peter Gould

=== Breaking Bad (2008–2013) ===
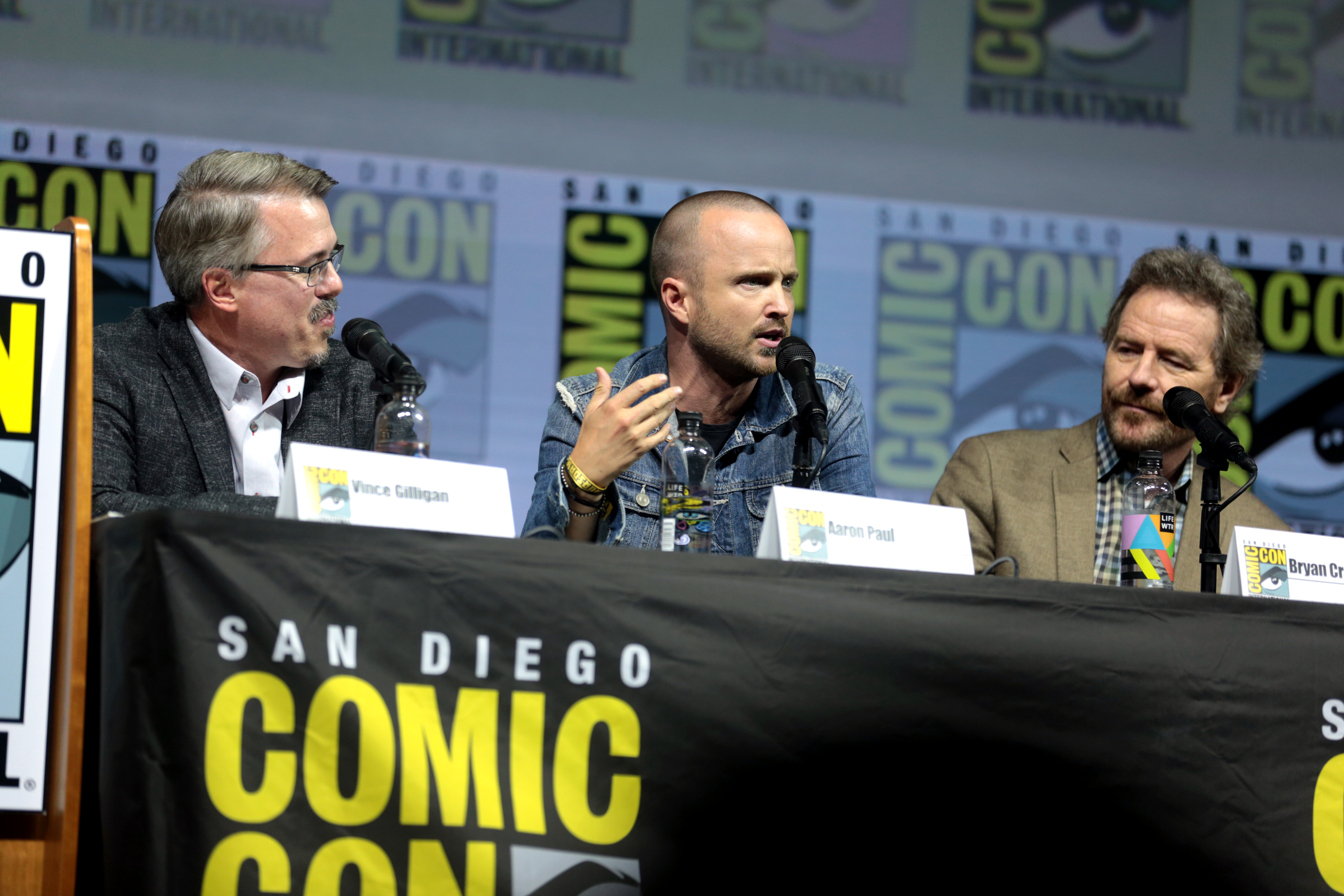
Breaking Bad creator Vince Gilligan (left) and actors Aaron Paul (center) and Bryan Cranston (right).

Breaking Bad tells the story of Walter White (Bryan Cranston), an underpaid, overqualified, and dispirited high-school chemistry teacher in Albuquerque, New Mexico. After being diagnosed with stage-three lung cancer, he enlists the help of his former chemistry student, Jesse Pinkman (Aaron Paul), to produce and distribute crystal meth to secure his family's financial future. He tries to leave the drug-making business, but continues to be drawn into the criminal underworld, and soon becomes a major drug kingpin under the name "Heisenberg" which he conceals from his family and friends.

Among the show's co-stars are Anna Gunn and RJ Mitte as Walter's wife Skyler and son Walter Jr., and Betsy Brandt and Dean Norris as Skyler's sister Marie Schrader and her husband Hank, a DEA agent. Others include Bob Odenkirk as Walter's and Jesse's lawyer Saul Goodman, Jonathan Banks as private investigator and fixer Mike Ehrmantraut, and Giancarlo Esposito as drug kingpin Gus Fring. The final season introduces Jesse Plemons as the criminally ambitious Todd Alquist, and Laura Fraser as Lydia Rodarte-Quayle, a cunning business executive secretly managing Walter's global meth sales for her company.

Breaking Bad was created by Vince Gilligan, who had spent several years writing the Fox series The X-Files. Gilligan wanted to create a series in which the protagonist became the antagonist. He added that his goal with Walter White was to turn him from Mr. Chips into Scarface.

The show aired on AMC from January 20, 2008, to September 29, 2013, consisting of five seasons for a total of 62 episodes. Breaking Bad received widespread acclaim and has been praised by many critics as one of the greatest television shows of all time. The series would receive a total of sixteen Emmy Awards throughout its run.

=== Better Call Saul (2015–2022) ===
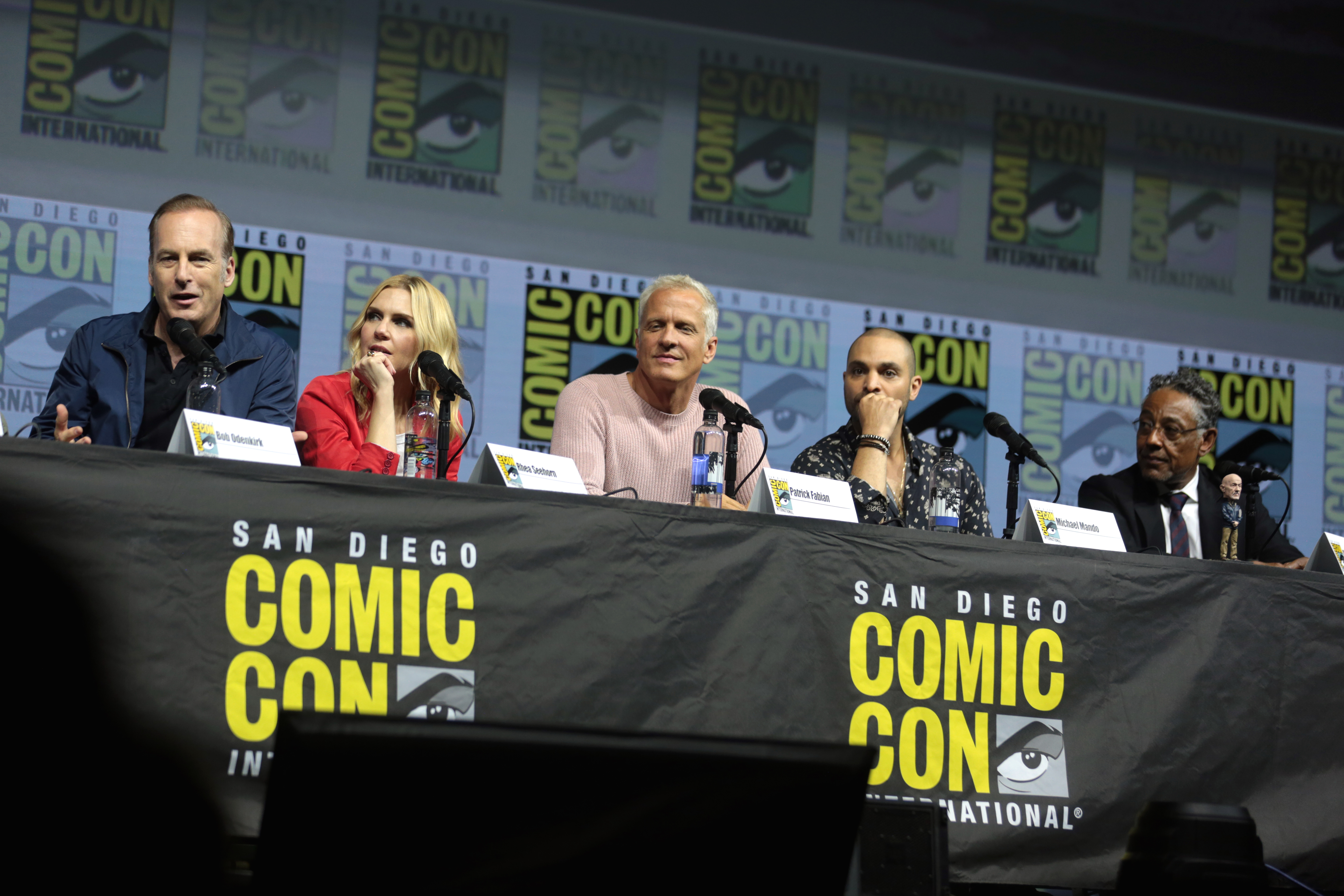
Better Call Saul cast members, from left to right, Bob Odenkirk, Rhea Seehorn, Patrick Fabian, Michael Mando and Giancarlo Esposito.

Better Call Saul focuses on Saul Goodman's life, six years before he became Walter's lawyer, as Jimmy McGill, a more earnest lawyer trying to turn away from his troublesome conman days. Throughout the series, Jimmy gradually transforms into Saul Goodman, a morally compromised and flamboyant criminal defense lawyer who assists criminals in their misdeeds. The show also features segments and eventually full episodes centering on Goodman's fate after the events of Breaking Bad.

Bob Odenkirk would reprise the titular role for the spin-off. Additionally, Jonathan Banks and Giancarlo Esposito star and reprise their roles as Mike Ehrmantraut and Gus Fring, respectively, while several other Breaking Bad cast members have guest-starred on the show. Newcomers to the starring cast of Better Call Saul include Rhea Seehorn as Jimmy's love interest and fellow attorney Kim Wexler, Michael McKean as Jimmy's older brother Chuck McGill, Patrick Fabian as Jimmy's rival attorney Howard Hamlin, Michael Mando as the cunning criminal Nacho Varga, and Tony Dalton as Lalo Salamanca, the charismatic enforcer who later helps run his family's drug business.

Saul Goodman was originally to appear in Breaking Bad in four episodes within the show's second season, but became a main character through the rest of the show's run in part due to being a fan favorite and the strength of his acting abilities. Odenkirk, Vince Gilligan, and Peter Gould, who wrote the episode that introduced Goodman, started discussions near the end of Breaking Bad of a possible spin-off expanding on the character. They eventually settled on the idea of a prequel to show the origins of Saul about six years prior to the events of Breaking Bad. In April 2013, AMC and Sony Pictures Television expressed interest in Gilligan and Gould's spin-off series concept, and they officially ordered Better Call Saul on September 11, 2013.

The show aired on AMC from February 8, 2015, to August 15, 2022, consisting of six seasons for a total of 63 episodes. Better Call Saul has received similar critical praise as Breaking Bad, with some even deeming it superior to its predecessor. It is considered as a prime example of how to produce a spinoff work that defies the usual expectations of such forms.

== Film ==
=== El Camino: A Breaking Bad Movie (2019) ===
El Camino: A Breaking Bad Movie follows the events of Breaking Bad's series finale "Felina", as Jesse Pinkman tries to outrun his misdeeds and searches for his freedom to Alaska. Aaron Paul reprised the role of Jesse after a six-year absence, and several other Breaking Bad characters made appearances.

Vince Gilligan wrote, directed and produced the film. While writing "Felina", Gilligan asked himself what happened to Jesse after the events of the series. Near the tenth anniversary of Breaking Bad's premiere, Gilligan started sharing the idea of creating a sequel film based on this concept. Paul, who portrayed Jesse on the series and who still felt attached to the character, expressed eagerness to be involved with any idea for a Breaking Bad continuation. When Gilligan made his initial film pitch to Sony Pictures Television, the executives in the room quickly agreed to come on board. After completing the script, Gilligan shopped the film to a few potential distributors, settling on Netflix and AMC due to their history with the show.

The sequel film was formally announced in February 2019. It was released exclusively on Netflix on October 11, 2019, also received a limited theatrical release in the United States from October 11 to 13, 2019. It was later broadcast on AMC on February 16, 2020. Critics praised Gilligan's direction and Paul's performance, but gave a mixed consensus regarding the film's necessity to Breaking Bad's chronology.

== Web series ==
=== Breaking Bad: Original Minisodes (2009–2011) ===
Breaking Bad: Original Minisodes is a web series based on the television series Breaking Bad. A total of 17 "minisodes", which are more comedy-oriented than most full episodes, were released over the course of three years.

=== Better Call Saul Employee Training (2017–2022) ===
From 2017 to 2022, AMC released four separate short series that feature a mix of live action and animated segments in conjunction with the last four seasons of Better Call Saul. Season three featured Los Pollos Hermanos Employee Training with Esposito portraying Gus Fring, season four featured Madrigal Electromotive Security Training with Mike Ehrmantraut with Banks as Mike, season five featured Ethics Training with Kim Wexler with Seehorn as Kim and side-voiceovers from Odenkirk as Jimmy and Patrick Fabian as Howard, and season six featured Filmmaker Training with the film crew that helped Jimmy make his advertisements. These were released over the course of each season on YouTube and through AMC's social media. The first three series consisted of ten episodes, while the last consisted of six.

Both Los Pollos Hermanos Employee Training and Ethics Training with Kim Wexler received the Primetime Emmy Award for Outstanding Short Form Comedy or Drama Series. Madrigal Electromotive Security Training with Mike Ehrmantraut was initially nominated for the same award, while Jonathan Banks was initially nominated for the Primetime Emmy Award for Outstanding Actor in a Short Form Comedy or Drama Series, but the academy had to pull the nominations after discovering the episodes were shorter than the category's required runtime. Filmmaker Training would also be nominated for Primetime Emmy Award for Outstanding Short Form Comedy, Drama or Variety Series.

=== Slippin' Jimmy (2022) ===
Variety reported in March 2021 that AMC was developing a spin-off animated series, Slippin' Jimmy. The series, a prequel based on younger Jimmy and Chuck's time in Cicero, Illinois, was developed by Ariel Levine and Kathleen Williams-Foshee, who previously worked on the associated live-action Better Call Saul Employee Training (2017–2022). Voice actors include Chi McBride, Laraine Newman, and Sean Giambrone as Jimmy.

Slippin' Jimmy was later revealed as a short-form web series; a six-part animated series to be released online during the sixth season of Better Call Saul. Told in the style of classic 1970s-era cartoons, each episode is an ode to a specific movie genre — from Spaghetti Westerns and Buster Keaton to The Exorcist. The series was produced by Rick and Morty animators Starburns and written by Levine and Williams-Foshee. Six episodes, each around 8–9 minutes in length, were released on AMC+ on May 23, 2022.

=== Saul4Democracy (2026) ===
On June 14, 2026, a short video titled "Know Your Rights" was released on a YouTube channel called Saul4Democracy. The video featured Odenkirk, in character as Saul Goodman, giving a public service announcement to the audience informing them of their rights. The video ended with Banks as Mike Ehrmantraut voicing his approval of the message. It was the first time Odenkirk and Banks reprised these roles since Better Call Saul ended in 2022. Better Call Saul showrunner Peter Gould confirmed the video's legitimacy on Bluesky, adding that it was not generated by artificial intelligence.

Four total short videos would be released on the Saul4Democracy channel. Odenkirk was primarily featured in a majority of them, though Banks would be the only subject in the last. Following the fourth video, Gould stated on Bluesky that there would be no further installments.

== Short films ==
=== Chicks 'N' Guns (2013) ===
In 2013, an eight-minute bonus scene titled Chicks 'N' Guns was included with Breaking Bad's fifth season DVD and Blu-ray sets. Written by Jenn Carroll and Gordon Smith and directed by Michelle MacLaren, the scene offers a backstory on how Jesse Pinkman obtained the gun seen in the episode "Gliding Over All". Sony Pictures released a behind-the-scenes featurette discussing the scene on its YouTube channel.

=== No Picnic (2017) ===
On June 19, 2017, the night of Better Call Saul's third season finale, fans were able to access the three-minute short film, No Picnic, which features the characters Betsy and Craig Kettleman, who had not been seen since the first season. The short, directed by Saul associate producer Jenn Carroll and written by the show's writers' assistant Ariel Levine, shows the Kettleman family organizing a picnic close to family patriarch Craig, who is seen picking up roadside litter with his fellow inmates as part of his prison sentence.

=== Snow Globe: A Breaking Bad Short (2020) ===
In conjunction with the television premiere of El Camino: A Breaking Bad Movie on AMC, the network released a three-minute short film Snow Globe: A Breaking Bad Short on its official YouTube account on February 17, 2020.

=== American Greed: James McGill (2022) ===
In April 2022, a few weeks before Better Call Saul's sixth season premiere, the CNBC Prime YouTube account uploaded American Greed: James McGill. Written by Peter Gould's assistant Valerie Chu, the ten-minute short is a mockumentary done in the style of the documentary series American Greed. It features interviews with several recurring Better Call Saul characters recounting their memories of Jimmy McGill and Kim Wexler.

=== Breaking Good (2023) ===
On February 12, 2023, a commercial for PopCorners chips aired during Super Bowl LVII. Titled Breaking Good, the short was filmed in a desert past Lancaster, California. It was directed by Vince Gilligan and features Bryan Cranston, Aaron Paul, and Raymond Cruz reprising their roles as Walter White, Jesse Pinkman, and Tuco Salamanca, respectively.

== Adaptations ==
=== Metástasis (2014) ===
On March 13, 2013, after several days of speculation fueled by Univision, Sony confirmed that it would be making a Spanish-language remake of Breaking Bad titled Metástasis starring Diego Trujillo as Walter Blanco (Walter White) and Roberto Urbina as José Miguel Rosas (Jesse Pinkman), alongside Sandra Reyes and Julián Arango in unnamed roles. On October 2, 2013, the cast list was revealed to include Reyes as Cielo Blanco (Skyler White) and Arango as Henry Navarro (Hank Schrader), and that the show would be set in Colombia. The equivalent of Saul Goodman is named Saúl Bueno.

The series ran from June 8, 2014, to September 18, 2014, airing a total of 62 episodes.

=== Unproduced South Korean remake ===
On February 14, 2023, it was reported by The Hankyoreh that Breaking Bad would be remade in South Korea. The production company JP E&M was reported to be producing the series which would be aired on an OTT streaming platform over four seasons. The first season was planned to be aired in early 2024 and would have been directed by Lee Chang-yeol. There have been no additional updates since the initial announcement.

== Recurring cast and characters ==
List indicators

This section includes characters who will appear or have appeared in multiple Breaking Bad and Better Call Saul media.

- An empty grey cell indicates the character was not in the media, or that the character's official presence has not yet been confirmed.
- ^{E} indicates an appearance not included in the theatrical cut.
- ^{R} indicates a recurring role in the media.
- ^{V} indicates a voice-only role.
- ^{Y} indicates a younger version of the character.

Character	Television series		Film	Web series			Short films					Adaptations
Character	Breaking Bad	Better Call Saul	El Camino	Employee Training	Slippin' Jimmy	Saul4Democracy	Chicks 'N' Guns	No Picnic	Snow Globe	American Greed	Breaking Good	Metástasis
Character	2008–2013	2015–2022	2019	2017–2022	2022	2026	2013	2017	2020	2022	2023	2014
=== Main characters ===
Walter White Heisenberg	Bryan Cranston	Bryan Cranston	Bryan Cranston							Pictured	Bryan Cranston	Diego Trujillo
Jesse Pinkman	Aaron Paul	Aaron Paul	Aaron Paul				Aaron Paul			Pictured	Aaron Paul	Roberto Urbina
Henry "Hank" Schrader	Dean Norris	Dean Norris								Pictured		Julián Arango
Marie Schrader	Betsy Brandt	Betsy Brandt										Constanza Camelo
Skyler White	Anna Gunn											Sandra Reyes
Walter "Flynn" White Jr.	RJ Mitte											Diego Garzon Flores
Gustavo "Gus" Fring The Chicken Man	Giancarlo Esposito	Giancarlo Esposito		Giancarlo Esposito								Manuel Gómez
James "Jimmy" McGill Saul Goodman	Bob Odenkirk	Bob Odenkirk		Bob Odenkirk	Sean Giambrone	Bob Odenkirk	Bob Odenkirk			Pictured		Luis Eduardo Arango
Michael "Mike" Ehrmantraut	Jonathan Banks	Jonathan Banks	Jonathan Banks	Jonathan Banks		Jonathan Banks						Edgardo Román
Todd Alquist	Jesse Plemons		Jesse Plemons						Jesse Plemons			Pedro Calderón
Lydia Rodarte-Quayle	Laura Fraser	Laura Fraser							Laura Fraser^{V}			Diana Ángel
Kimberly "Kim" Wexler		Rhea Seehorn		Rhea Seehorn						Pictured		
Howard Hamlin		Patrick Fabian		Patrick Fabian								
Ignacio "Nacho" Varga		Michael Mando								Pictured		
Charles "Chuck" McGill		Michael McKean			Silent					Pictured		
Eduardo "Lalo" Salamanca		Tony Dalton								Pictured		
=== Recurring characters ===
Ed Galbraith	Robert Forster	Robert Forster	Robert Forster									
Austin Ramey	Todd Terry	Todd Terry	Todd Terry									
Skinny Pete	Charles Baker		Charles Baker				Charles Baker					Jairo Ordóñez
Brandon "Badger" Mayhew	Matt L. Jones		Matt L. Jones									Héctor Mejía
Diane Pinkman	Tess Harper		Tess Harper									
Adam Pinkman	Michael Bofshever		Michael Bofshever									
Jane Margolis	Krysten Ritter		Krysten Ritter									Julieth Restrepo
Old Joe	Larry Hankin		Larry Hankin									
Kenny	Kevin Rankin		Kevin Rankin									
Steven Gomez	Steven Michael Quezada	Steven Michael Quezada								Pictured		Julio Pachón
Tuco Salamanca	Raymond Cruz	Raymond Cruz									Raymond Cruz	Damián Alcázar
Hector Salamanca	Mark Margolis	Mark Margolis										Frank Ramírez
Gonzo	Jesus Payan Jr.	Jesus Payan Jr.										
No-Doze	Cesar Garcia	Cesar Garcia										
Domingo "Krazy-8" Molina	Max Arciniega	Max Arciniega										
Emilio Koyama	John Koyama	John Koyama										
Spooge	David Ury	David Ury										
Gale Boetticher	David Costabile	David Costabile										Matías Maldonado
Victor	Jeremiah Bitsui	Jeremiah Bitsui										
Juan Bolsa	Javier Grajeda	Javier Grajeda										
Kaylee Ehrmantraut	Various	Various										
Leonel Salamanca	Daniel Moncada	Daniel Moncada										
Marco Salamanca	Luis Moncada	Luis Moncada										
Huell Babineaux	Lavell Crawford	Lavell Crawford										Mauricio Cújar
Francesca Liddy	Tina Parker	Tina Parker								Pictured		Constanza Hernández
Tyrus Kitt	Ray Campbell	Ray Campbell										
Eladio Vuente	Steven Bauer	Steven Bauer										
Nick	Eric Steining	Eric Steining										
Tim Roberts	Nigel Gibbs	Nigel Gibbs										
Wendy	Julia Minesci	Julia Minesci										
Officer Saxton	Stoney Westmoreland	Stoney Westmoreland										
Barry Goodman	JB Blanc	JB Blanc										
Stephanie Doswell	Jennifer Hasty	Jennifer Hasty										
Peter Schuler	Norbert Weisser	Norbert Weisser										
Stacey Ehrmantraut	Stand-in	Kerry Condon										Stand-in
Betsy Kettleman		Julie Ann Emery						Julie Ann Emery		Julie Ann Emery		
Craig Kettleman		Jeremy Shamos						Jeremy Shamos		Jeremy Shamos		
Marco Pasternak		Mel Rodriguez				Kyle S. More						
Clarence		David Mattey	David Mattey									
Suzanne Ericsen		Julie Pearl	Julie Pearl							Julie Pearl		

== Other media ==
Prior to the start of production of the fifth season, Jeffrey Katzenberg had approached the series' creators and offered them to produce three additional episodes at US$25 million a piece compared to the normal US$3.5 million cost of each episode, as to create material for his future streaming platform, Quibi. The episodes would have been broken up into 5 to 10 minute chapters as to fit Quibi's micro-format. The Breaking Bad team turned down this offer, chiefly as there was not much material they could continue into these episodes.

=== Docuseries ===
==== The Broken and the Bad (2020) ====
In June 2020, AMC announced The Broken and the Bad, a six-part true crime short-form docuseries inspired by Breaking Bad and Better Call Saul. The miniseries explores real-world stories and situations that mirror the fictional worlds of both shows. Episode subjects include the psychology of con artists and hit men, the economics of massive drug operations, as well as a town in the United States that caters to those who suffered from electromagnetic hypersensitivity, a condition that Better Call Saul character Chuck McGill believed afflicted him. The miniseries was hosted by Giancarlo Esposito and premiered on the AMC app and AMC.com on July 9, 2020.

=== Talk shows ===
==== Talking Bad (2013) ====
From August 11, 2013, to September 29, 2013, eight episodes of the live talk show, Talking Bad, aired on AMC, following Breaking Bad. The host, Chris Hardwick, and guests—including celebrity fans, cast members, and Breaking Bad crew members—discuss episodes that aired immediately preceding the talk show. Talking Bad was inspired by the success of Talking Dead (also hosted by Hardwick), which aired immediately following new episodes of The Walking Dead, and the talk shows share a similar logo and theme music.

==== Talking Saul (2016–2022) ====
From February 15, 2016, to August 8, 2022, six episodes of the live talk show, Talking Saul, aired on AMC, following Better Call Saul. The host, Chris Hardwick, and guests—including celebrity fans, cast members, and Better Call Saul crew members—discuss episodes that aired immediately preceding the talk show. Talking Saul was inspired by the success of Talking Dead and Talking Bad (both of which were also hosted by Hardwick).

=== Podcasts ===
==== Breaking Bad Insider Podcast (2009–2013) ====
The Breaking Bad Insider Podcast is a pre-recorded series where series creator Vince Gilligan and editor Kelley Dixon host a weekly conversation with the cast and crew of Breaking Bad to discuss the newest episode. The podcast began during the first episode of the second season.

==== Better Call Saul Insider Podcast (2015–2022) ====
The Better Call Saul Insider Podcast is a pre-recorded series which the creators gather to discuss the episode recently broadcast. Originally started as part of the Breaking Bad series, the podcast discusses the production of the show and features actors discussing their decisions and process of the characters they play. The crew also details their methods in deciding how an episode was shot. The show routinely includes the major cast, director and camera crew of the respective episodes.

=== Comics ===
==== Breaking Bad: All Bad Things (2013) ====
AMC released the digital comic book Breaking Bad: All Bad Things in August 2013. The comic "recaps the first four-and-a-half seasons of Walter White's descent from mild-mannered chemistry teacher to drug kingpin".

==== Better Call Saul: Client Development (2015) ====
In February 2015, in advance of the series premiere, AMC released its first digital comic book for Better Call Saul. Titled Better Call Saul: Client Development, it details the history of Saul Goodman and Mike Ehrmantraut alongside how they find out Mr. Mayhew is Walter White. This would later be retconned by the Better Call Saul episode "Breaking Bad".

==== Better Call Saul: Saul Goodman and the Justice Consortium in the Clutches of the Judgernaut! (2016) ====
In February 2016, in advance of the second-season premiere, AMC released Better Call Saul: Saul Goodman and the Justice Consortium in the Clutches of the Judgernaut!

=== Video games ===
Gilligan has stated interest in production of video games based on the Breaking Bad franchise, though he does not want the result to be a bad game such as the infamous E.T. the Extra-terrestrial. One idea he had was to have a game similar to the Grand Theft Auto series. A VR project had been in development by Firesprite, but was canceled in 2018 during early development for unknown reasons.

==== Breaking Bad: Criminal Elements (2019) ====
Breaking Bad: Criminal Elements is a strategy mobile video game developed by Plamee and published by FTX Games. It was released for iOS and Android on June 6, 2019. The players are tasked with building their own drug empire under the wing of Walter White and Jesse Pinkman.

The game was announced in January 2019, and was developed in close collaboration with the creators of the show so that it would feel accurate. Criminal Elements was loosely based on a previous attempt to bring a Breaking Bad mobile game to the market, Breaking Bad: Empire Business. The game received mediocre reviews and was closed in September 2020.

== Notable fan works ==
=== Breaking Bad – Ozymandias (2013) ===
In October 2013, New York composer Sung Jin Hong announced his intentions to create an opera inspired by Breaking Bad episode "Ozymandias". The mini-opera, titled Breaking Bad – Ozymandias, premiered on January 26, 2014. The opera incorporates themes from both Percy Bysshe Shelley's sonnet "Ozymandias" as well as the episode that shares the same name.

=== Breaking Bad: The Movie (2017) ===
In 2017, French editors Lucas Stoll and Gaylor Morestin created a fan edit, simply titled Breaking Bad: The Movie, condensing the entire series into a two-hour feature film and uploaded it onto Vimeo. They had worked on the film for around two years prior to its release. However the film was soon taken down for copyright violation. Critic Alan Sepinwall remarked that the movie "doesn't in any way work as a standalone entity." In order to achieve feature film length, notable side characters like Tuco Salamanca and the Salamanca Cousins were cut entirely, and the conclusion to the Gustavo Fring story occurs off-screen.

=== Faking Bad (2019) ===
Faking Bad is a 2019 parody musical with music, lyrics and book by Rob Gathercole based on AMC's Breaking Bad created by Vince Gilligan. The musical condenses the entire plot of Breaking Bad down to a one-act play in under two hours with a heightened sense of camp and satire. A physical release of the cast recording was available for sale at the official Breaking Bad Store in Albuquerque, New Mexico.

== Future ==
Near the end of Better Call Saul's broadcast run in August 2022, Vince Gilligan said that he does not plan to create any more works in the Breaking Bad franchise, as he cannot expect any further installments to be critically successful. He said "I think I'm starting to sense you've got to know when to leave the party, you don't want to be the guy with a lampshade on your head." Peter Gould later acknowledged that by the premiere of Breaking Bad's finale, he and Gilligan were already working on the spin-off, but when Better Call Saul's finale aired, the two were working separately on new projects.

Despite this, Giancarlo Esposito, who portrays Gus Fring, stated that "Gustavo Fring isn't done", expressing interest in a "show that would reflect Gustavo's past [and] to play the vision in my mind that inspired and informed the Gus you see but don't know. I would like you to know that Gus. It's intriguing to know where he came from", although admitting it would be up to Gilligan and his team and partners, with whom he had discussed the concept of such a series in the past. As of September 2022, Esposito has continued to express interest in the project, tentatively entitled "The Rise of Gus", describing it as a "yearning inside" him.

Gould would later say that he would consider other entries at some point in the future. He stated "Vince [Gilligan] and I both decided it would be good to give the Gilliverse a little bit of a rest, but we had a big board with ideas or scenes we were interested in or would be fun — and there were a lot of them still on that board when we finished up the show. Maybe that's a good thing, though. You want to leave something you didn't get to."

Aaron Paul and Bob Odenkirk both expressed interest in returning to their characters Jesse Pinkman and Saul Goodman, respectively, but both mentioned that any revival required Gilligan and Gould's involvement. Gilligan mentioned the possibility of Jesse continuing his adventure in Haines, Alaska, where his character ended at the conclusion of El Camino, while Odenkirk said that Saul's story would have to take place in prison during his sentence following the events of Better Call Saul.
