= Grenade (Pluribus) =

- Pluribus episode
- Zosia (Karolina Wydra) holds out the hand grenade that Carol requested.
- Episode no.: Season 1 Episode 3
- Directed by: Gordon Smith
- Written by: Gordon Smith
- Cinematography by: Paul Donachie
- Editing by: Chris McCaleb
- Original air date: November 14, 2025
- Running time: 43 minutes

Guest appearances
- Miriam Shor as Helen L. Umstead; Robert Bailey Jr. as DHL Guy; Thor Knai as Bjorn

Episode chronology
← Previous "Pirate Lady"	Next → "Please, Carol"

"Grenade" is the third episode of the American post-apocalyptic science fiction television series Pluribus. The episode was written and directed by executive producer Gordon Smith. It was released on Apple TV on November 14, 2025.

The series is set in Albuquerque, New Mexico, and follows author Carol Sturka, who is one of only thirteen people in the world immune to the effects of "the Joining", resulting from an extraterrestrial virus that had transformed the world's human population into a peaceful and content hive mind (the "Others"). In the episode, Carol and Zosia return to Albuquerque, where Carol realizes the extent of what the Others can do for her.

The episode received mostly positive reviews from critics, who praised the performances, production values and character development.

== Plot ==
Seven years prior, Carol and Helen visit an ice hotel in Norway. Helen is fascinated, while Carol is upset about their room's design and the freezing conditions, joking that she could have frozen her eggs there, and is more concerned with where her latest novel is placed in the bestselling charts. Nevertheless, she joins Helen in witnessing the aurora borealis.

In the present day, Carol and Zosia fly back to Albuquerque. Carol telephones one of the immune, Manousos Oviedo, in Asunción, Paraguay, but he curses at her. Carol calls him back and angrily curses as well before hanging up. Dropping her off at home, Zosia gives her a gift Helen ordered for her before the Joining. Carol demands that the hive forget all the memories they have of Helen. The following day, Carol gets a specific breakfast that she believes indicates that the hive is disobeying her order to forget Helen, though they deny this. She instead drives to Sprouts Farmers Market, and is shocked to find it empty. Contacting Zosia, she is told that the hive mind moved key resources like groceries for allocation, and she demands they bring everything back. Just a few moments later, a group of Others arrives to restock the market.

That night, the power goes off in most of the city in an attempt by the Others to preserve energy. Carol is annoyed by this turn of events while calling Zosia and she vents her frustration, remarking that she would be better off with a hand grenade. Later, Zosia arrives with the requested grenade, and Carol invites Zosia to drink with her. As Carol questions the plans they have for her, Zosia brings up her trip to Norway with Helen. Angered by what she perceives as the hive mind invoking Helen's memories against her wishes, Carol primes the grenade, and is shocked when she finds it is real. Zosia snatches the grenade, throws it out the window, and tackles Carol to protect her. Zosia is injured by the explosion, and the Others immediately send an ambulance.

While waiting for Zosia to recover at the hospital, Carol speaks to a representative of the hive mind in a DHL uniform, asking why they gave her a grenade. She asks if they would give her anything, even a nuclear weapon; despite some reluctance and deliberation, the man states that they ultimately would. Carol asks the Others to leave her alone as she contemplates this.

== Production ==
=== Development ===
The episode was written and directed by executive producer Gordon Smith. This marked Smith's first writing and directing credit. As the first episode of the series not to be written nor directed by series creator Vince Gilligan, Smith said that the episode was "a tough one to write", explaining "How was [Carol] gonna relate to all of these joined people? Was she gonna start hanging out with them, and asking them questions about who they are, or were? Or is she going to have to spend some time digesting this?"

=== Filming ===
For the scene where Carol visits a Sprouts Farmers Market, only to find it empty, a real Sprouts store in Albuquerque was used. The art department emptied the store for three days and nights, and required a mix of practical and visual effects to properly depict the empty space. While Smith admitted that a completely new set could have been used instead, he said "we wanted to make sure that you felt like you were coming in and out of a real store, so we'd still have some of those problems, and I don't think you'd have the same scope."

== Reception ==
"Grenade" earned mostly positive reviews from critics. Scott Collura of IGN gave the episode a "great" 8 out of 10 rating and wrote in his verdict, "Another strong episode of Pluribus fleshes out the world around Carol, even while questions about the dangerous nature and true motivations of the Joined build. Rhea Seehorn continues to stand out as the red-eyed Carol who is barely coping with this new normal, even while she stands up to the frightening group-think that surrounds her as best she can... and starts to become aware of the power she might wield over them as well."

Noel Murray of The A.V. Club gave the episode a "B+" grade and wrote, "On the whole, “Grenade” features less grand spectacle than we saw last week, which might make some viewers feel a little impatient. There's still so much we don't know about what just happened to humanity or why. Because Carol doesn't trust the collective to give her honest information, she refuses to ask them important things, like: Why did the aliens send the eternal happiness formula to Earth in the first place? That can be frustrating, for sure."

Scott Tobias of Vulture gave the episode a 4 star rating out of 5 and wrote, "It doesn't seem to be in Carol's character to launch a bloody one-woman revolution, but if they're willing to give her new tools to fight back on humanity's behalf, who is she to turn them down?"

Sean T. Collins of Decider wrote, "Perhaps the show is purposefully hinting that Carol and Helen were a less than happy couple. Perhaps it's hoping we won't notice. Given the way it's fudging some key aspects of its high concept, I'm less inclined to give it the benefit of the doubt than I was at the start." Carly Lane of Collider gave the episode a 9 out of 10 rating and wrote, "this week, Carol's out to put [how much free will the "Others" have] to the test, with her continued willingness to push the envelope culminating in an explosive ending that reveals the episode's title isn't metaphorical in the slightest."

Josh Rosenberg of Esquire wrote, "As much as I just want to sit one of these hive mind freaks down and interrogate them, I must admit that it wouldn't make for good TV. Pluribus, on the other hand? It's the only show on TV right now where I genuinely can't predict where the story will head next. Much like finding yourself in an ice hotel, it's exciting to feel something new—and a bit scary." Carissa Pavlica of TV Fanatic gave the episode a 4.5 star rating out of 5 and wrote, "Pluribus Season 1 Episode 3 is one of those strange hours of television where nothing 'big' happens, and yet I found myself more clenched and uneasy than I ever am watching any so-called thriller."

=== Accolades ===
Award	Category	Nominee(s)	Result	Ref.
Art Directors Guild Awards	One-Hour Contemporary Single-Camera Series	Denise Pizzini	Nominated	
Primetime Creative Arts Emmy Awards	Outstanding Picture Editing for a Drama Series	Chris McCaleb	Nominated	
Primetime Creative Arts Emmy Awards	Outstanding Production Design for a Narrative Contemporary Program (One Hour or More)	Denise Pizzini, Dins Danielsen, and Ashley Michelle Marsh	Won	
