= Please, Carol =

- Pluribus episode
- Carol asks Zosia how to reverse the outbreak while the Others surround them.
- Episode no.: Season 1 Episode 4
- Directed by: Zetna Fuentes
- Written by: Alison Tatlock
- Cinematography by: Marshall Adams
- Editing by: Skip Macdonald
- Original air date: November 21, 2025
- Running time: 46 minutes

Guest appearances
- Jeff Hiller as Larry; Soledad Campos as Maternal Other; Tim Keller as himself

Episode chronology
← Previous "Grenade"	Next → "Got Milk"

"Please, Carol" is the fourth episode of the American post-apocalyptic science fiction television series Pluribus. The episode was written by executive producer Alison Tatlock and directed by Zetna Fuentes. It was released on Apple TV on November 21, 2025.

The series is set in Albuquerque, New Mexico, and follows author Carol Sturka, who is one of only thirteen people in the world immune to the effects of "the Joining", resulting from an extraterrestrial virus that had transformed the world's human population into a peaceful and content hive mind (the "Others"). In the episode, Carol tries to find out more information about the Others, hoping to find a loophole to reverse the Joining.

The episode received critical acclaim, with critics praising the performances, character development and cliffhanger ending.

Jeff Hiller submitted the episode to support his Emmy nomination for Outstanding Guest Actor in a Drama Series.

== Plot ==
A man, Manousos Oviedo, lives in a storage facility office in Paraguay where he analyzes radio frequencies. The Others deliver him food, which he refuses to eat; instead, he resorts to eating canned dog food taken from a locker. He is interrupted when he is called by Carol, but he immediately hangs up. When she calls again, he angrily curses at her. She calls a third time just to curse him back. (Note: As depicted in "Grenade".) Startled by this, he writes Carol's name down.

In Albuquerque, Carol leaves the hospital, taking a police cruiser to return home. She finds that the Others have repaired the grenade damage, as she distractedly gave them her consent in the ambulance. She begins writing a list of things she knows about them, and brings in one of the Others, Larry, to ask him about her novel. She finds that they are always positive about anything, and are willing to put her books on par with William Shakespeare's works. When she asks about Helen's thoughts, she finds out that Helen did not particularly like her novels. Carol asks Larry to leave, concluding that the Others cannot lie.

Carol visits Zosia in the hospital, where she is recovering from her injuries. Carol asks if the Joining is reversible, but Zosia does not answer outwardly. During their discussion, Carol reveals that when she was a teenager her mother sent her to a conversion therapy camp. Carol sneaks into the pharmacy to steal sodium thiopental and tests its effectiveness as a truth serum at home by filming herself with a video camera. Checking the video, she watches herself mourning Helen and noting Zosia's sex appeal. Afterwards, she flushes the camera's memory card down the toilet.

Carol returns to the hospital and wheels Zosia outside, stealthily injecting the serum into her IV bag. When Zosia starts to lose mental clarity, Carol probes her about reversing the Joining. Zosia struggles to speak, and a crowd of Others surround them. They repeat "Please, Carol" as Zosia collapses from cardiac arrest, and several Others begin attempts to resuscitate her.

== Production ==
=== Development ===
The episode was written by executive producer Alison Tatlock and directed by Zetna Fuentes. This marked Tatlock's first writing credit and Fuentes' first directing credit.

=== Writing ===
On Zosia's cardiac arrest, Karolina Wydra commented, "I had chills reading the script. If I'm crying, the whole world is crying, and it manifests in their physicality. That moment is about us feeling sad that Carol will do whatever it takes to not join us. We can't make her happy. There's nothing we can do. It makes us really sad, and the whole world experiences that sadness. I remember when we shot it, and people were chanting “Carol, please,” it was really eerie. You felt the collective mind as one." She also added that Zosia maintained her tranquility as "I know that once [Carol] experiences the goodness of this new world, she will know how special it is."

=== Casting ===
The episode features a cameo appearance by Tim Keller, the Mayor of Albuquerque, New Mexico, who is credited as "Mayor Tim" in the episode.

=== Music ===
For the final scene, composer Dave Porter turned the phrase "Please, Carol" into a chorus for the extras to sing, "we melded the real, live actors who were there at the moment, with an increasing build of the actual choir singing along in a very rhythmic way, and we had it all very carefully syncopated and put to time so that it built to this big crescendo at the end there."

== Critical reviews ==
"Please, Carol" earned critical acclaim. Scott Collura of IGN gave the episode a "great" 8 out of 10 rating and wrote in his verdict, "Another strong episode of Pluribus in week four! Now that Carol has settled into this zany new world a bit, it's nice to see her finally asking some of the questions that we, the viewers, have been pondering since the start. Of course, the weird thing about that is that sometimes it's hard to not feel bad for the Joined who she's steamrolling over to get answers from, particularly Zosia. Meanwhile, Carlos-Manuel Vesga's Manousos has finally arrived, introducing us to a whole different (if old-school) way of dealing with this apocalyptic event."

Noel Murray of The A.V. Club gave the episode an "A" grade and wrote, "This week's Pluribus is called “Please, Carol” (a title that will acquire a mortifying resonance by the end); and it's an episode that really chews into the meat of what this series is about, at least when it comes to Carol's all-too-human tenacity. There are two moments in particular I want to spotlight, because while they're brief, they both speak to the larger question of What Carol Wants And Why It Matters."

Scott Tobias of Vulture gave the episode a perfect 5 star rating out of 5 and wrote, "If there was ever any question about Carol's commitment to saving humanity, it's put to rest this week with her willingness to learn what Helen, the woman she loved and respected most in this world, actually thought of her work."

Sean T. Collins of Decider wrote, "Throughout this week's episode of Pluribus — a marked turnaround from last week's lackadaisically plotted dip in quality — Carol works overtime to test just how trustworthy her newfound omnipresent companions really are. But is she asking the wrong questions?" Carly Lane of Collider gave the episode a 9 out of 10 rating and wrote, "Like "Grenade" before it, the title of this week's episode, "Please, Carol," adopts a wholly new meaning once you get to those closing minutes — and likely leaves more than one viewer questioning just how far the protagonist of Pluribus is willing to go in search of a solution."

Josh Rosenberg of Esquire wrote, "Gilligan likely sensed that viewers might be feeling some frustration this week. He named episode 4 “Please, Carol” to match what I say every time I beg her to ask the hive mind one single question about how they operate. So, as if the people inside my little TV box were actively listening, episode 4 finally sees Carol begin her investigation in earnest." Carissa Pavlica of TV Fanatic gave the episode a 4 star rating out of 5 and wrote, "This episode finally cracks open the question I've been wondering since week one: How does this show sustain itself? And now I think I see it. Or maybe I can imagine a possible scenario."
