= Holographic Studios =

Holography gallery in Manhattan, New York

Coordinates: 40.739925°N 73.980090°W

Holographic Studios as seen from East 26th St in New York City, NY.

Holographic Studios, located in the borough of Manhattan in New York City, is the world's oldest gallery of holography. It was founded in 1979 by Jason Sapan, one of the pioneers of holography. The storefront level gallery features the world's largest collection of motion image integral holograms. On display in the gallery are a variety of different types of holographic images, including a collection of celebrity hologram portraits. There are also cylindrical 360° floating images, multiple image holograms that change as you walk by, and computer generated holograms as well as a selection of novelty hologram items and stickers. Directly below the gallery is the laser laboratory where holograms are created. Holographic Studios creates custom holograms, holographic portraits, offers classes, and operates tours.

In 2024, Sapan announced that the East 26th location would close and that 2 locations would open: 1 in Manhattan and 1 in Hawaii.

== History ==
The studio was founded in 1979 in a brownstone that was originally a blacksmith's forge. The current building sits on land that was part of the Rose Hill estate of Revolutionary General Horatio Gates.

Over the decades, the studio has filmed portrait holograms of Andy Warhol, President Bill Clinton, Isaac Asimov, NYC Mayor Ed Koch, Prime Minister Edward Heath, Pierre Cardin, Sally Jessy Raphael, John Kenneth Galbraith, Phyllis Diller, Billy Idol, The Smothers Brothers, Phil Donahue, and John Cage. Their corporate clientele include commissions for Mitsubishi, AT&T, Tag Heuer, Goodyear, IBM, NYU Medical Center, Macy's, and Revlon.

== Notable interns ==
- John Gaeta, who won the Academy Award for visual effects in The Matrix
- Vince Gilligan, who won multiple Emmys for his television show Breaking Bad
- Jason Corsaro, who won Grammy awards as a recording engineer on albums including Like a Virgin by Madonna
- Sonnie Brown, who starred in the Lincoln Center production of Far East
