= A.M.P.E.D. =

American television series

- Created by: Vince Gilligan; Frank Spotnitz
- Written by: Vince Gilligan; Frank Spotnitz
- Directed by: Robert Lieberman; Frank Spotnitz
- Starring: Lee Tergesen; Tony Curran
- Country of origin: United States
- Original language: English

Production
- Producers: Vince Gilligan; Frank Spotnitz; Robert Lieberman

Original release
- Network: Spike
- Release: 2007 – 2007

A.M.P.E.D. is a 2007 American unaired television pilot created by Vince Gilligan and Frank Spotnitz.

== Overview ==
Police officials work to stop an epidemic from spreading that causes genetic mutations in victims and makes them violent and destructive.
