= John Doe (The X-Files) =

- The X-Files episode
- Episode no.: Season 9 Episode 7
- Directed by: Michelle MacLaren
- Written by: Vince Gilligan
- Production code: 9ABX07
- Original air date: January 13, 2002
- Running time: 44 minutes

Guest appearances
- James Pickens Jr. as Alvin Kersh; Alfred De Contreras as Bartender; Ramón Franco as Nestor; Eduardo Antonio Garcia as Mariano Molina; Jacob Handy as Luke Doggett; Zachary Handy as Luke Doggett; Charlie Hartsock as Lawyer; Bo Kane as McCormick; Zitto Kazann as Caballero; Barbara Patrick as Barbara Doggett; FJ Rio as Second Officer; René Rivera as First Officer; Luis Robledo as Crackhead; Lucy Rodriguez as Operator; Frank Roman as Domingo Salmeron

Episode chronology
← Previous "Trust No 1"	Next → "Hellbound"
- The X-Files season 9

"John Doe" is the seventh episode of the ninth season of the American science fiction television series The X-Files. The episode first aired in the United States on January 13, 2002, on the Fox network. It was written by executive producer Vince Gilligan, and directed by co-executive producer Michelle MacLaren. The episode is a "monster-of-the-week" episode, a stand-alone plot which is unconnected to the mythology, or overarching fictional history, of The X-Files. "John Doe" earned a Nielsen rating of 5.0 and was viewed by 5.28 million households. The episode received largely positive reviews from television critics.

The show centers on FBI special agents who work on cases linked to the paranormal, called X-Files; this season focuses on the investigations of John Doggett (Robert Patrick), Monica Reyes (Annabeth Gish), and Dana Scully (Gillian Anderson).

In this episode, Doggett wakes up in Mexico with no memory of who he is or how he got there. Meanwhile, Reyes and Scully struggle to locate him. The two later discover that Doggett's memory has been taken by a "memory vampire" that works for a drug cartel.

"John Doe", which was written after Gilligan had been thinking of a story involving a "memory vampire" for months, was MacLaren's directorial debut. Noted director Kim Manners helped guide her through the process. Director of photography Bill Roe used specific lighting for the episode; indoor scenes are dark and hard to make out whereas outside scenes are bright and over-saturated with light. The Mexican hotel apartment was created from Fox Mulder's (David Duchovny) old apartment set.

== Plot ==
John Doggett (Robert Patrick) awakens inside an abandoned warehouse to find a man stealing one of his shoes. Doggett chases the man outside, where he summons two Mexican police officers. One of the policemen hits the man with his nightstick, while the other demands his identification. When Doggett finds he has no papers, the officer asks him his name. Doggett is shocked to realize he can't remember his own identity.

Doggett is taken to the local jail, where he meets a fellow prisoner named Domingo. Domingo is eventually freed and offers to have Doggett bailed out as well, under the condition that Doggett help him perform his criminal tasks. Doggett agrees, but changes his mind once he is released. Nestor, Domingo's friend, pulls a gun, but Doggett quickly overpowers him and takes the weapon. Doggett returns to the warehouse in hopes of finding clues to his identity. From time to time, he experiences flashbacks of his wife and son, but has no idea who they are.

In the meantime, in Washington, Walter Skinner (Mitch Pileggi) and Dana Scully (Gillian Anderson) examine video footage from a security camera positioned at the Mexican border. FBI Deputy Director Alvin Kersh disbands the task force searching for Doggett, believing the video is proof that he entered Mexico on his own free will and was not abducted. Meanwhile, Doggett phones a U.S. Marine Corps public affairs office, hoping his Marine tattoo will shed some light on his true identity. Before he is able to ask any questions, he notices policemen nearby and flees.

Scully traces Doggett's phone call and has Monica Reyes (Annabeth Gish) travel to the Mexican town where he was last seen. It is revealed that Caballero, an enforcer for the local drug cartel, is a "memory vampire": he can absorb the memories of those posing a threat to the cartel. Reyes finds Doggett and faces gunfire from the police, who are likewise controlled by the cartel; all the while, Reyes attempts to remind Doggett of who they are. Doggett remembers his son. The agents are rescued by Skinner and the Mexican Federales. Doggett tearfully admits that he is happy to have all of his memories, even the bad ones, "as long as I remember the good.”

== Production ==
=== Writing and directing ===
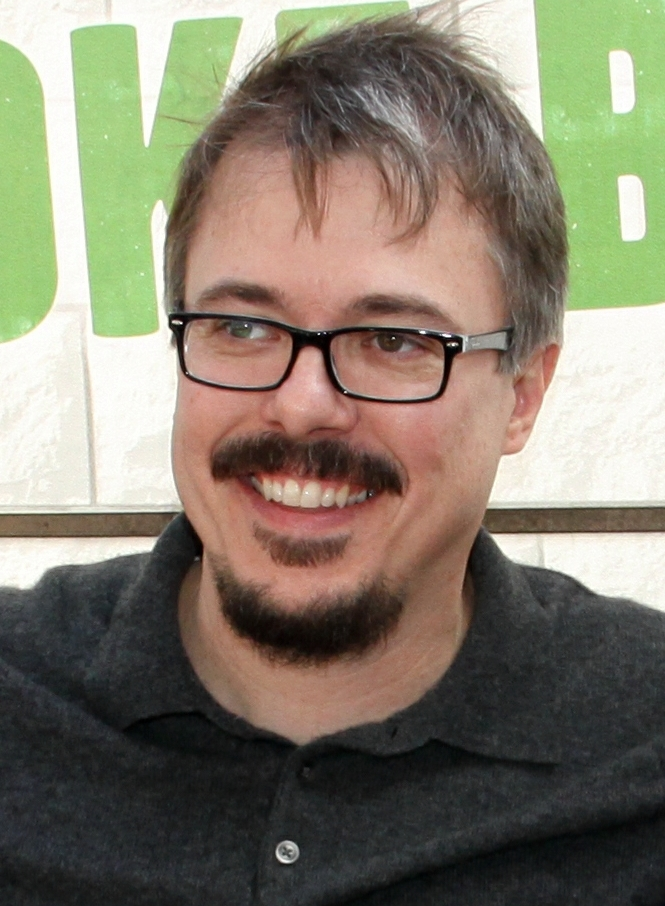
"John Doe" was written by executive producer Vince Gilligan.

"John Doe" was written by executive producer Vince Gilligan and directed by Michelle MacLaren. The episode marked Gilligan's first solo episode for the ninth season. Gilligan had "fiddled" with the story of a "memory vampire" for months, before writing it. The notion to set the story in Mexico and center it around Robert Patrick's character was Frank Spotnitz's idea. From there the story "went together fairly easily." "John Doe" was co-executive MacLaren's directorial debut. Although she had never helmed an episode before, MacLaren had learned much working with Kim Manners, one of the series' prolific directors. She later noted, "Kim taught me how he breaks down a script and prepares his shot list. The most powerful thing he said to me was that he imagines the show all cut together and sees the movie in his head and really visualizes it." Gilligan later said that MacLaren "really rose to the occasion and really did her homework."

The bus crash scene was created with the use of elaborate "smoke and mirrors", according to Gilligan. Over nine cameras were used to film the entire scene. Several of the cameras were under-cranked in order to give the illusion that the bus was going faster than it really was. A steel ramp was buried in the ground to flip the bus. Despite the finished product, Gilligan later joked, "You could have stood there and had a sandwich while the thing was backing up: it was so slow."

=== Filming and effects ===
Director of photography Bill Roe borrowed motifs from Steven Soderbergh's film Traffic (2000) for some of the shots. Roe also made the decision to shoot the outdoor scenes using "exteriors three, four stops over what you should shoot it at", resulting in very washed-out palate. When talking about the episode, Roe said: "It was really dark so we had this huge contrast of lighting. It was dark and warm and brown. When you go inside, you can barely see things, but when you're outside, it's just blaring." To create the Mexican town featured in the episode, scenes were filmed in Pomona, a town located outside of Los Angeles. A matte of the town's background and blue sky were then cut and a faux Mexican background was added. Special effects expert Mat Beck also digitally added a number of posters into outdoor scenes.

When creating the Mexican hotel apartment, the crew redecorated what was once Fox Mulder's (David Duchovny) apartment set. Production Designer Corey Kaplan said of the development of the episode that, "It was very creative and very rewarding for us as an art department, to create the complete total look of being in another culture." Several Spanish songs are featured in the episode. When the characters are at the cantina, the song "La Calentura" by Roberto Ruiz is playing. During scenes in the garage, "Juana La Cubana" by Fito Olivares is featured.

== Reception ==
"John Doe" first aired in the United States on January 13, 2002. The episode earned a Nielsen household rating of 5.0, meaning that it was seen by 5.0% of the nation's estimated households and was viewed by 5.28 million households. (Note: At the time of airing, the estimated number of households was 105.5 million. Thus, 5.0 percent of 105.5 million is 5.28 million households.) "John Doe" was the 66th most watched episode of television that aired during the week ending January 13. The episode later aired in the United Kingdom on December 16, 2002, on BBC Two.

The episode received largely positive reviews from television critics. Jessica Morgan from Television Without Pity gave the episode an A− rating. Juliette Harrisson of Den of Geek named "John Doe" the best stand-alone episode of season nine and called it "a refreshing change of pace". Robert Shearman and Lars Pearson, in their book Wanting to Believe: A Critical Guide to The X-Files, Millennium & The Lone Gunmen, gave the episode a glowing review and rated it five stars out of five. The two praised Gilligan's script and Patrick's performance, noting that the former "writes the script with a dirtiness that gives it real power" and the latter's acting was "extraordinary". Furthermore, Shearman and Pearson wrote that "'John Doe' shows that there's still a fresh take to be had on The X-Files after all". Meghan Deans of Tor.com applauded the episode and called it "a clear bright spot in a dark and dismal season, both in its script and in its shooting." She felt that the focus on Doggett was effectively done, and the script focused on "strong character arcs", which worked towards its advantage. In the end, she concluded that the episode was "part of the X-Files, more so than would an alien or a mutant" because it focused on the idea that "pain makes you, more pain makes you better, and living within that pain keeps you alive." M.A. Crang, in his book Denying the Truth: Revisiting The X-Files after 9/11, praised the central premise, the cinematography and Patrick's performance, calling "John Doe" a "stylishly produced entry".

== Bibliography ==
- Hurwitz, Matt; Knowles, Chris (2008). The Complete X-Files. Insight Editions. ISBN 978-1933784809.
- Shearman, Robert; Pearson, Lars (2009). Wanting to Believe: A Critical Guide to The X-Files, Millennium & The Lone Gunmen. Mad Norwegian Press. ISBN 978-0975944691.
