= Pirate Lady =

- Pluribus episode
- Carol aboard Air Force One attempting to convince the other unaffected survivors to try to reverse the outbreak
- Episode no.: Season 1 Episode 2
- Directed by: Vince Gilligan
- Written by: Vince Gilligan
- Cinematography by: Marshall Adams
- Editing by: Skip Macdonald
- Original release date: November 7, 2025
- Running time: 63 minutes

Guest appearances
- Miriam Shor as Helen; Samba Schutte as Koumba Diabaté; Menik Gooneratne as Laxmi; Darinka Arones as Kusimayu; Anna Mhairi as Vesper; Max Reeves as Margaux; Olivia Rouyre as Genevieve; Rayaan Kamal Khan as Ravi; Piyush Gupta as Aarush; Viji Nathan as Padma; Sharon Gee as Xiu Mei; David Niu as Neu Xiansheng

Episode chronology
← Previous "We Is Us"	Next → "Grenade"

"Pirate Lady" is the second episode of the American post-apocalyptic science fiction television series Pluribus. The episode was written and directed by series creator Vince Gilligan. It was released on Apple TV on November 7, 2025, as the second part of a two-episode series premiere, along with "We is Us".

The series follows Carol Sturka (Rhea Seehorn), a cynical novelist who soon finds that she is one of the few survivors of an alien virus outbreak that turns most of humanity into a permanently optimistic hive mind. "Pirate Lady" picks up the morning after the outbreak, and depicts Carol coming to terms with the new status quo. The episode introduces Karolina Wydra as Zosia, a member of the hive mind sent to be Carol's guide.

The episode received highly positive reviews, with critics praising its performances, philosophical themes, and humorous tonal shift, as well as the way it establishes the series' new status quo.

== Plot ==
In Tangier, Morocco, also ravaged by the virus outbreak, a disheveled woman, Zosia, helps dispose of bodies before boarding and piloting a plane to Albuquerque.

Carol wakes the morning after the outbreak and begins digging a grave for her partner Helen in her backyard, but it proves difficult. Zosia arrives and introduces herself as a representative of the hive mind. She offers Carol a bottle of water, which Carol discards. Carol realizes that Zosia closely resembles Raban—the male love interest from her Winds of Wycaro romance novels—originally conceived as female, which only Helen knew. Zosia says the collective knows this because Helen joined them before dying. Outraged, Carol berates them for speaking for Helen after killing her; Zosia suddenly begins convulsing.

Carol drives off to find help, but stops at a construction site where everyone is similarly unresponsive, only to reawaken soon after. Carol returns home, finding Zosia gone, and makes a call on her phone to permit the collective to send her back before resuming her digging. Zosia returns, explaining that Carol’s anger disrupted the hive mind and killed many, horrifying Carol. Seeing Carol's exhaustion, Zosia completes the grave using an excavator. As night falls, Carol demands to speak with the other English-speaking uninfected survivors.

Zosia organizes a meeting between the English-speaking survivors at Bilbao Airport in Spain. Carol meets four of them, each of different nationality and accompanied by infected relatives, while the fifth, a Mauritanian man named Koumba Diabaté, arrives later aboard Air Force One. He leads a hedonistic lifestyle with a harem of models. The group meets aboard his plane, where Carol finds that the others are content and is unable to convince them that the hive mind is unethical.

At an outdoor lunch ordered by Diabaté, Zosia insists to Carol that the hive is nonviolent and that assimilating others is a mere biological imperative, but admits that over 886 million died over the course of the infection of the world. Carol is horrified to learn the disruption she inadvertently caused earlier killed another 11 million. Carol storms off, only to trip and fall; when Zosia and the others offer help, she screams at them and triggers another global seizure.

By next morning, the other survivors, with the exception of Diabaté, leave. He plans to fly to Las Vegas with Zosia as his sexual companion, but asks for Carol’s permission, since the hive cannot decide for her. Repulsed, Carol gives up and leaves. Watching Zosia board Diabaté's plane, Carol suddenly changes her mind and runs to stop them from taking off.

== Development ==
Vince Gilligan conceived the series' premise after becoming "weary of writing bad guys" after a decade of working on Breaking Bad and Better Call Saul. After Better Call Saul ended in August 2022, he pitched a new series that he would develop with Sony Pictures Television. A bidding took place, and Apple TV won the rights to the show in September 2022, giving it a two-season order. Gilligan was formally named as showrunner and executive producer. Rhea Seehorn, who had starred as Kim Wexler in Better Call Saul, was cast as Carol Sturka, a successful but discontented author of romance novels. Gilligan wrote the character specifically for Seehorn and crafted the character to be a "flawed good guy" who tries to save the world.

Gran Canaria in the Canary Islands was used for the Tangier scenes, with the crew temporarily replacing signage with French and Arabic text. Though the exterior of the Bilbao Airport in Bilbao, Spain, was used as the backdrop in some spots, the crew was not allowed to film in the airport, and instead used a former congressional building in Oviedo, Spain, designed by the same architect as the airport, with the crew dressing the interior based on the airport's design within the 24-hour shooting session.

== Reception ==
"Pirate Lady" received highly positive reviews, with critics praising the episode's performances, philosophical themes, and humor. Scott Tobias of Vulture gave the episode 5 out of 5 stars, calling the episode "thrillingly expansive" and praising its tonal shift from horror to "comedy and philosophy", taking interest in the episode's depiction of the unexpected nuances of the alien takeover. He compared Gilligan's direction—particularly in the episode's "classic WTF cold open"—to his work on Breaking Bad and Better Call Saul. Noel Murray of The A.V. Club, jointly reviewing the first two episodes, gave the premiere an A−, also comparing the "wonderfully odd" cold open to the Breaking Bad franchise, and describing the episode's middle section—depicting the meeting between Carol and the other survivors of the outbreak—as "easily the most complex and ambitious stretch of these two episodes." He felt the episode suggested the series' overall thesis to be that "humanity, as messy as it can be, is still preferable to the loss of individual will". Scott Collura of IGN, also reviewing the first two episodes together, gave the premiere an 8 out of 10, felt the second episode saw Gilligan "fully embracing both the (literally) out-of-this-world concept while also having fun with it all." He praised Wydra for accomplishing the "very difficult task" of portraying Zosia as a "cypher" that nevertheless elicits sympathy from the audience.

=== Accolades ===
Award	Category	Nominee(s)	Result	Ref.
Golden Reel Awards	Outstanding Achievement in Sound Editing – Broadcast Long Form Effects / Foley	Nick Forshager, Todd Toon, Jeff Cranford, Jason Charbonnaeu, and Stefan Fraticelli	Nominated	
