= We Is Us =

- Pluribus episode
- Carol Sturka (Rhea Seehorn) discovers that everyone at the hospital is unresponsive.
- Episode no.: Season 1 Episode 1
- Directed by: Vince Gilligan
- Written by: Vince Gilligan
- Cinematography by: Marshall Adams
- Editing by: Skip Macdonald
- Original release date: November 7, 2025
- Running time: 56 minutes

Guest appearances
- Miriam Shor as Helen; Peter Bergman as Davis Taffler; Karan Soni as Deshpande; Allan McLeod as Bob; Jack Mikesell as Ray; Woody Fu as Dave; Blair Beeken as Jenn; Eric Steinig as Mel

Episode chronology
← Previous —	Next → "Pirate Lady"

"We Is Us" is the series premiere of the American post-apocalyptic science fiction television series Pluribus. The episode was written and directed by series creator Vince Gilligan. It was released on Apple TV on November 7, 2025, along with the second episode, "Pirate Lady".

The series follows Carol Sturka (Rhea Seehorn), a cynical novelist who soon finds that she is one of the few survivors of an alien virus outbreak that turns most of humanity into a permanently optimistic hive mind. The episode depicts the discovery and subsequent outbreak of the virus, largely from Carol's perspective.

The episode received widespread critical acclaim, with reviewers praising Gilligan's script and direction, Seehorn's performance, and the episode's tension and unique tone, with several comparing it to the 1956 film Invasion of the Body Snatchers.

Rhea Seehorn and Miriam Shor submitted the episode to support their Emmy nominations for Outstanding Lead Actress in a Drama Series and Outstanding Guest Actress in a Drama Series, respectively, with Seehorn winning in her category.

== Plot ==
Astronomers detect a radio transmission originating about 600 light-years away at Kepler-22b and determine that it contains an encoded ribonucleic acid (RNA) sequence. Government scientists then begin attempts to insert this sequence into a range of test organisms. About a year and a half later, at a US Army Medical Research Institute of Infectious Diseases lab, two researchers are studying infected rats when a rat bites one of the researchers. The infection spreads throughout the facility staff, who begin acting strangely and working in tandem to spread the disease further through contaminated petri dishes.

A month later, alcoholic romance novelist Carol Sturka returns home to Albuquerque after touring for the latest book in her Winds of Wycaro series, along with her manager and romantic partner Helen. Over drinks at a local bar, Carol discusses her hatred for her books and fans, and Helen urges her to finish the draft of her new, serious novel. They step outside to smoke, where Carol notices planes above flying in a uniform manner, leaving trails of an aerosol. Suddenly, a man crashes his truck into another car in the parking lot; Carol runs to help him and finds him convulsing; she turns to Helen, who is also convulsing and suddenly falls on the ground, hitting her head. Carol runs into the bar seeking help, but finds everyone else similarly unresponsive. Unable to drive her own car due to failing the breathalyzer test that unlocks it, Carol takes the truck of the man who crashed, loads Helen's unconscious body onto it, and speeds to a hospital.

Carol arrives at a hospital only to find everyone there also convulsing. Helen soon dies from her injuries despite Carol's attempts to resuscitate her. Suddenly, everyone else around her awakens and gathers around her, addressing her by name; a doctor kisses Carol on the lips, but she does not become infected. Terrified, Carol drives home with Helen's body, finding the rest of the population working in unison to put out fires in the city. At her home, Carol cannot find her keys; two infected children from the neighboring house remind Carol where she began hiding a spare key years ago. She enters her house and tunes into the TV station C-SPAN, which shows a man waiting at the podium in the White House press room and a phone number displayed onscreen asking Carol by name to call. Carol calls the number and speaks to the man, Davis Taffler, an official in the United States Department of Agriculture. Davis apologizes for the suddenness of the widespread event and explains that the virus originated from the extraterrestrial signal that was being researched, rendering nearly all of humanity into a single hive mind. He tells Carol that she is one of only twelve people known to be immune to the virus, which the hive mind will continue seeking to assimilate. Carol hangs up and breaks down in tears while Davis attempts to reach her on the answering machine, insisting that the hive mind "just wants her to be happy".

== Development ==
Vince Gilligan conceived the series' premise after becoming "weary of writing bad guys" after a decade of working on Breaking Bad and Better Call Saul. After Better Call Saul ended in August 2022, he pitched a new series that he would develop with Sony Pictures Television. A bidding took place, and Apple TV won the rights to the show in September 2022, giving it a two-season order. Gilligan was formally named as showrunner and executive producer. Rhea Seehorn, who had starred as Kim Wexler in Better Call Saul, was cast as Carol Sturka, a successful but discontented author of romance novels. Gilligan wrote the character specifically for Seehorn and crafted the character to be a "flawed good guy" who tries to save the world.

Filming of the events where Carol witnesses the whole population begin to convulse was done with practical effects, with filming limited to night conditions and thus taking several days to complete. It also required around 300 extras, all of whom were trained by choreographer Nito Larioza to convulse in the same way to make it appear unsettling to the viewer, according to Seehorn.

=== Filming locations ===
The episode was filmed at several locations in and near Albuquerque, including:

- Discovery of the radio transmission/virus sequence: NRAO Very Large Array in Socorro, New Mexico:
- US Army infectious disease laboratory: Rio Rancho campus of Central New Mexico Community College
- Barnes & Noble store where Carol hosts a book-signing event: Coronado Center
- "Silver Jack Saloon", the bar where Carol witnesses the infections: The Butcher, a restaurant in Los Ranchos de Albuquerque
- Hospital Carol takes Helen to (and where Helen dies): Albuquerque College and Career High School at Central New Mexico Community College's main campus

== Reception ==
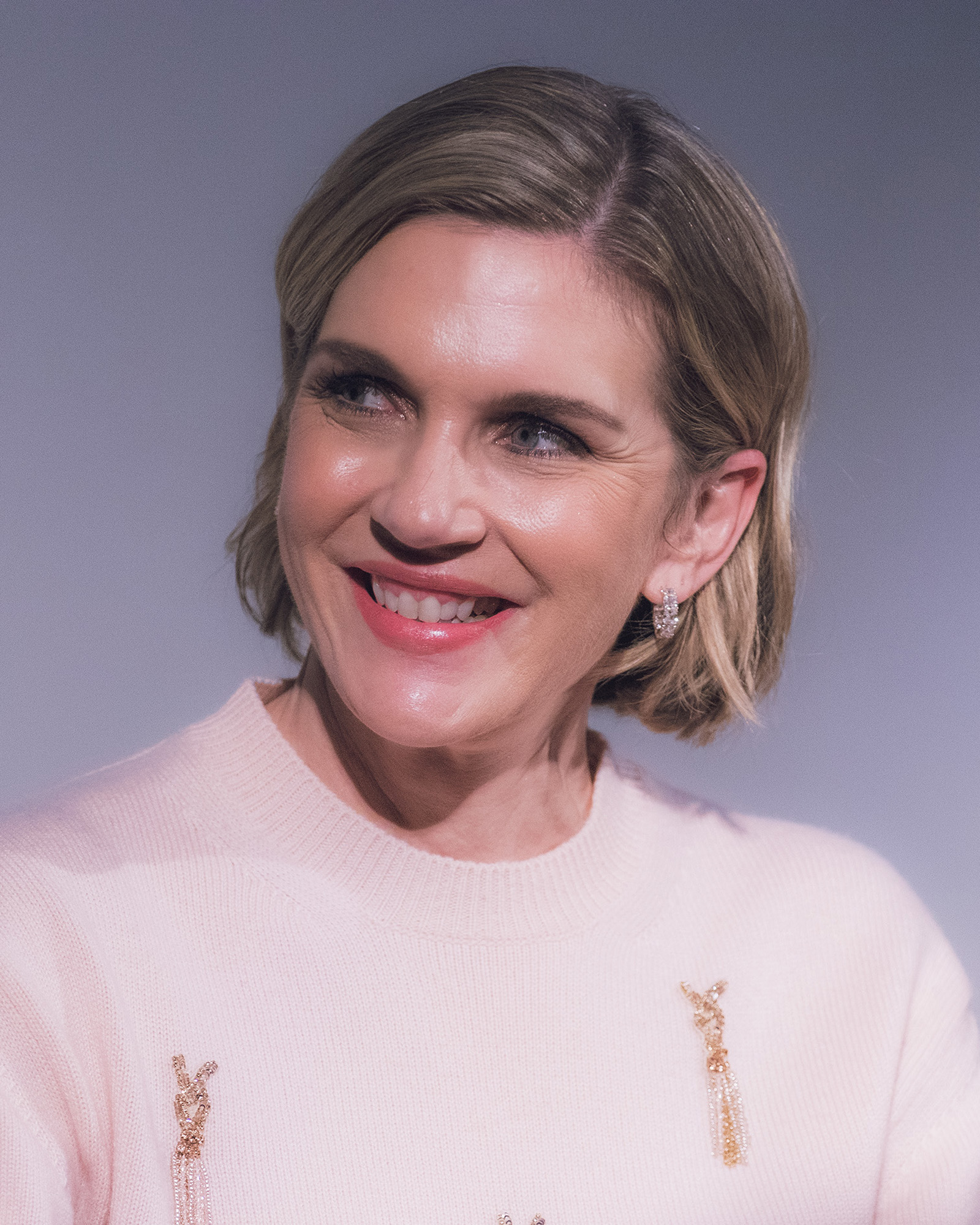
Rhea Seehorn's performance in the episode was widely praised by critics

"We Is Us" received widespread critical acclaim, with reviewers praising Gilligan's script and direction, Seehorn's performance, and the episode's tension, originality, and stylistic influences. On the review aggregator Rotten Tomatoes, the episode holds a 100% approval rating, with an average rating of 8.8/10, based on 6 critic reviews. Metacritic, which uses a weighted average, gave the episode a score of 8.5 out of 10, based on 22 critics, indicating "universal acclaim". Scott Tobias of Vulture gave the episode 5 stars out of 5, calling it a "terrific premiere" and drawing comparisons to John Carpenter's They Live (1988). He praised Gilligan's writing and Seehorn's performance for "expertly" capturing Carol's "confusion, trauma, and fury at what's happening to her and to Albuquerque and to the world she cannot yet see." Tobias also praised the episode's suspense and handling of information, writing, "the exciting part of the premiere is that it hits us with a grand-scale alien apocalypse while telling us tantalizingly little about what it all means." Noel Murray of The A.V. Club gave the premiere an A−, noting Seehorn's "unusual ability to express steely certainty and raw vulnerability within the same scene—or even the same shot", and praising Gilligan's depiction of the virus outbreak, writing, "these scenes are so strange, creepy, and funny that they're entertaining even when it's not clear right away exactly what's going on."

Josh Rosenberg of Esquire found the episode's tone "perfect", praising its balance between being "incredibly scary" and containing moments of "incredibly smart and witty dialogue". Scott Collura of IGN, reviewing the first two episodes, gave the premiere an 8 out of 10, praising the episode's inversion of popular sci-fi tropes from films such as Invasion of the Body Snatchers (1978), and feeling Gilligan "does something new with an old idea". He too praised Seehorn for "somehow depicting Carol as she digests not just the insanity that has erupted around her, but also the tragedy", and noting the "slightly comedic" vibe of the episode, "as if the preposterous nature of the situation can't wait to come out and play in future episodes." Sean T. Collins of Decider noted influences from several science fiction works in the premiere, including Invasion of the Body Snatchers, Night of the Living Dead (1968), 28 Days Later (2002), and the television series The Prisoner (1967–68). He praised Gilligan as "a filmmaker whose eye works as well along the temporal axis — stretching out takes to diabolical lengths and immersing the viewer in the chaos — as it does along the spatial axes — frequently framing Carol to look either trapped or dwarfed by the events surrounding her."

=== Accolades ===
Award	Date of ceremony	Category	Nominee(s)	Result	Ref.
ACE Eddie Awards	February 27, 2026	Best Edited Drama Series	Skip Macdonald	Nominated	
Astra TV Awards	August 15, 2026	Best Directing in a Drama Series	Vince Gilligan	Nominated	
Astra TV Awards	August 15, 2026	Best Writing in a Drama Series	Vince Gilligan	Won	
Cinema Audio Society Awards	March 7, 2026	Television Series – One Hour	Various (Note: Phillip W. Palmer, Larry Benjamin, Tim Hoogenakker, Dave Porter, Judah Getz, Jamison Rabbe, and Ron Mellegers)	Nominated	
Hugo Awards	August 30, 2026	Best Dramatic Presentation – Short Form	Vince Gilligan	Nominated	
Primetime Emmy Awards	September 14, 2026	Outstanding Directing for a Drama Series	Vince Gilligan	Nominated	
Primetime Emmy Awards	September 14, 2026	Outstanding Writing for a Drama Series	Vince Gilligan	Won	
Primetime Emmy Awards	September 14, 2026	Outstanding Lead Actress in a Drama Series	Rhea Seehorn	Won	
Primetime Creative Arts Emmy Awards	September 5–6, 2026	Outstanding Guest Actress in a Drama Series	Miriam Shor	Nominated	
Primetime Creative Arts Emmy Awards	September 5–6, 2026	Outstanding Cinematography for a Series (One Hour)	Marshall Adams	Nominated	
Primetime Creative Arts Emmy Awards	September 5–6, 2026	Outstanding Music Composition for a Series (Original Dramatic Score)	Dave Porter	Nominated	
Primetime Creative Arts Emmy Awards	September 5–6, 2026	Outstanding Music Supervision	Thomas Golubić	Nominated	
Primetime Creative Arts Emmy Awards	September 5–6, 2026	Outstanding Picture Editing for a Drama Series	Skip Macdonald	Won	
Primetime Creative Arts Emmy Awards	September 5–6, 2026	Outstanding Sound Mixing for a Comedy or Drama Series (One Hour)	Various (Note: Larry Benjamin, Tim Hoogenakker, Phillip W. Palmer, Dave Porter, Ron Mellegers, and Judah Getz)	Won	
