= Robert Lieberman =

American film and television director (1947–2023)

- Born: July 16, 1947; Buffalo, New York, U.S.
- Died: July 1, 2023 (aged 75); Los Angeles, California, U.S.
- Other name: Rob Lieberman
- Education: State University of New York at Buffalo
- Occupations: Film director, television director
- Years active: 1978–2021
- Spouses: Myrna Narad (m. 1969; div. 1979) Marilu Henner (m. 1990; div. 2001) Victoria Peters (m. 2010)
- Children: 4, including Nick Lieberman

Robert Lieberman (July 16, 1947 – July 1, 2023) was an American film and television director.

== Early life ==
Lieberman was born on July 16, 1947, in Buffalo, New York, and was raised in a working-class family; his father was a door-to-door salesman. He attended the State University of New York at Buffalo.

== Career ==
Lieberman founded the commercial production company Harmony Pictures and directed close to two thousand commercials. He received many Clio nominations and won 29. Lieberman in 1980 was the first winner of the DGA Award for Best Commercial Director. He was nominated another three times for the DGA Award and in 1996 won his second award. He also directed one film with Akshay Kumar called Speedy Singhs starring Camilla Belle and Vinay Virmani.

== Personal life ==
Lieberman was married from June 27, 1990, to June 7, 2001, to actress Marilu Henner; the divorced couple had two children, Nicholas Morgan and Joseph Marlon. He also has two children, Erin and Lorne Lieberman, from his first marriage. Lieberman married former model Vicki Peters, also known as Victoria Pwters, in 2010.

=== Illness and death ===
Robert Lieberman died of cancer in Los Angeles on July 1, 2023, at the age of 75.

== Filmography ==
=== Director ===
Films

- Fighting Back (1980)
- Will: G. Gordon Liddy (1982)
- Table for Five (1983)
- To Save a Child (1991)
- All I Want for Christmas (1991)
- Fire in the Sky (1993)
- D3: The Mighty Ducks (1996)
- NetForce (1999)
- Red Skies (2002)
- Second String (2002)
- The Dead Zone (2002)
- Final Days of Planet Earth (2006)
- The Stranger (2010)
- The Tortured (2010)
- Breakaway (2011)

Television series

- ABC Afterschool Specials (1978)
- thirtysomething (1987)
- Dream Street (1989)
- The Young Riders (1989)
- Gabriel's Fire (1990)
- Harts of the West (1993)
- Under Suspicion (1994)
- Medicine Ball (1995)
- Maloney (1996)
- Titanic (1996)
- Once and Again (1999)
- The X-Files (1999)
- Strong Medicine (2000)
- The Dead Zone (2002)
- Jake 2.0 (2003)
- Earthsea (2004)
- Killer Instinct (2005)
- A.M.P.E.D. (2007)
- Dexter (2006)
- Shark (2006)
- Brothers & Sisters (2007)
- Eureka (2007)
- Republic of Doyle (2009)
- Lost Girl (2010–2011)
- Haven (2010–2014)
- Nikita (2011)
- Eve of Destruction (2013)
- The Expanse (TV series) (2016)
- Private Eyes (TV series) (2016)
- Rogue (2016–2017)

=== Producer ===
Films

- To Save a Child (1991)
- Abandoned and Deceived (1995)
- Rag and Bone (1997)

Television series

- Dream Street (1989)
- Gabriel's Fire (1990)
- Harts of the West (1993)
- Marilu (1994)
- Under Suspicion (1994)
- Medicine Ball (1995)
- Moloney (1996)
- Strong Medicine (2000)
- The Dead Zone (2002)
- Jake 2.0 (2003)
- The Casino (2004)
- A.M.P.E.D. (2007)

=== Writer ===
- The Casino (2004)
- Killer Instinct (2005)
