= Jason Sapan =

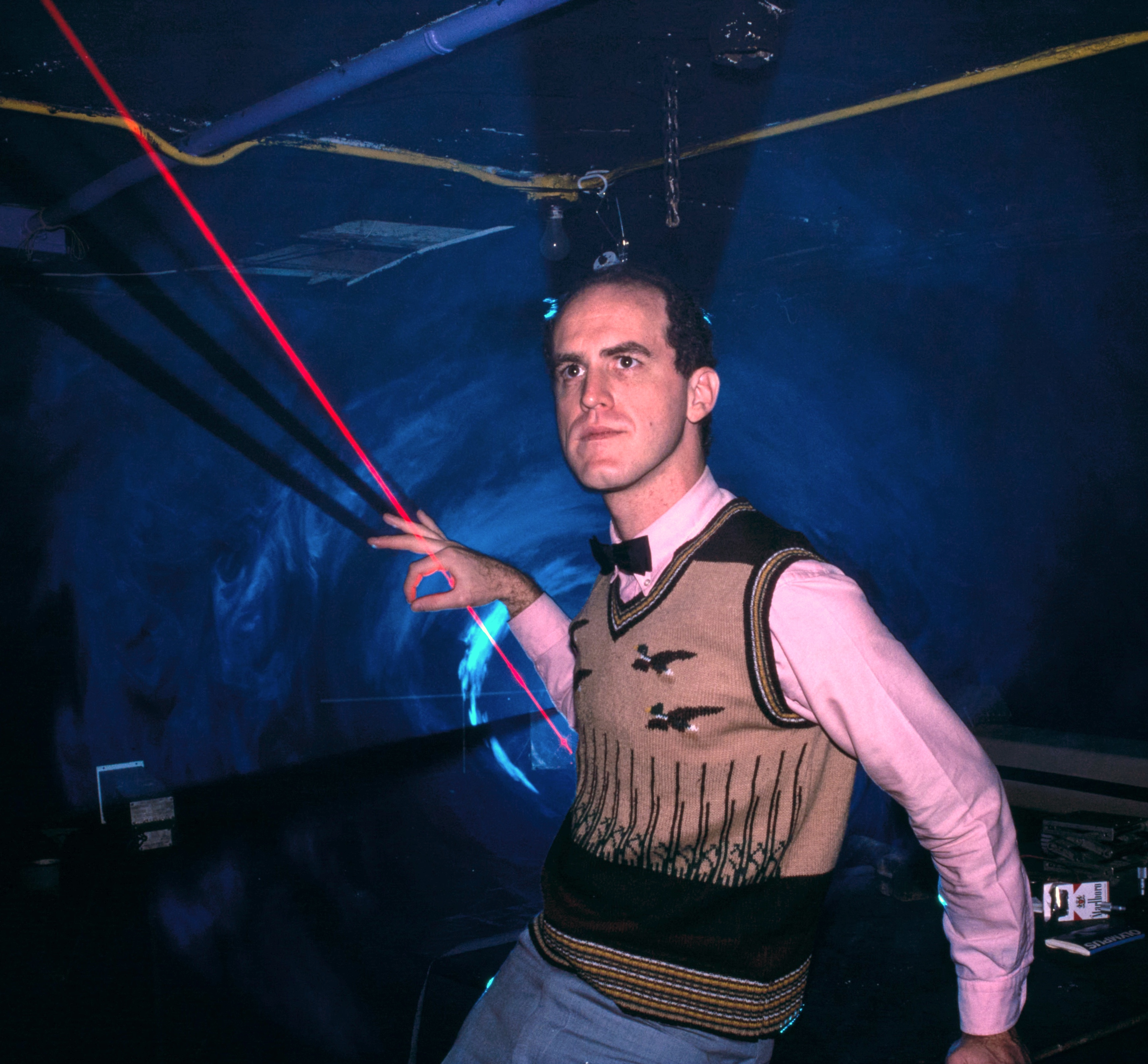
Sapan in 1982

Jason Sapan, also known as Dr. Laser (pronounced Sāpăn; born 1950) is a holographer and actor who is the founder of Holographic Studios, the world's oldest gallery of holography, located in the borough of Manhattan in New York City. He is one of the pioneers of modern holography, and has also worked as an educator, recording engineer, artist, blogger, and occasional actor. He has created portrait holograms of Andy Warhol, President Bill Clinton, Isaac Asimov, NYC Mayor Ed Koch, Prime Minister Edward Heath, Pierre Cardin, Sally Jessy Raphael, John Kenneth Galbraith, Phyllis Diller, Billy Idol, The Smothers Brothers, Phil Donahue, and John Cage. His corporate clientele include commissions for Mitsubishi, AT&T, Tag Heuer, Goodyear, IBM and NYU Medical Center.

Sapan has lectured at the School of the Visual Arts in NYC, School of the Art Institute of Chicago, Ohio State University, University of Vermont, City College of New York, New York University, and various other schools. He ran a Summer class at the Interactive Telecommunications Program (ITP) Grad School at NYU. As an assistant professor, he created a class titled "Hologram Hacks" in the Fall 2015 semester where students made holograms as an element of a project where the hologram served as a means to an end.

== Career ==
Sapan, also known as Dr. Laser, has been a professional holographer for over 40 years in New York City. His father was an electrical engineer who contracted for Bell Laboratories. He started getting interested in holography since his father would work with lasers and holograms. His career began in 1968 working at the first exhibition of holography (created by Bell Labs) at the Time Life building in New York City. He is best known for his holographic portraiture and laser special effects.

Before founding Holographic Studios in 1979, Sapan worked as an assistant recording engineer at Record Plant Studios in New York City, at a time when they were recording with John Lennon and Yoko Ono, Alice Cooper, Dizzy Gilespie, B.B. King, Stevie Wonder, Tammy Wynette, George Jackson, Roberta Flack, Eugene Ormandy and the Philadelphia Philharmonic Orchestra.

Sapan produced the laser light effects for the original Studio 54 on CBS, the Flock of Seagulls music video, (It’s Not Me) Talking, also appearing in the video, and the cult film, Class of Nuke 'Em High. He also served as a consultant for the film Vanilla Sky, and did laser effects for the ABC Weekend Special, Jeeter Mason and the Magic Headset. He became a member of the Editorial Board of the Lohud Exchange of the Journal News in 2016.

== Personal life ==
Sapan is married and has two children. They live in Westchester County, New York. He also has a residence in Hawaii.

== Exhibitions ==
- 1977, "Holo-Fame", Museum of Holography, New York City, US
- 1980, Avant Garde Festival, Pier 92, New York City, US
- 1982, "The Wreath", Armory Gallery, Central Park, New York City, US
- 1987, "Holograms", Gotham Fine Arts Gallery, New York City, US
- 2005, "Translating Solids: The Holographic Image", Hopkins Hall Gallery, Ohio State University, Columbus, Ohio, US
- 2010, "Light From The Shore", Solarium Gallery, Knox School, St. James, New York, US
- 2012, "Green | Red", Brooklyn Arts Council (The Archway Under the Manhattan Bridge), Brooklyn, New York, US
- 2012, "Artypes: Portraits", PACS Gallery, Brooklyn, New York, US
- 2014, "Magical Art Tricking The Eye", Hudson Guild Gallery, New York City, US
- 2014, "NYC Makers", MAD Biennial, New York City, NY, USA
