= Faking Bad (musical) =

2018 musical based on the 2008 television show

- The Unauthorised 'Breaking Bad' Parody Methsical
- Official cast album cover
- Music: Rob Gathercole
- Lyrics: Rob Gathercole
- Book: Rob Gathercole
- Setting: Albuquerque, New Mexico 2008–10
- Basis: Breaking Bad by Vince Gilligan
- Premiere: October 14, 2018: Theater N16, London, England
- Productions: 2018 London; 2023 London

Faking Bad: The Unauthorized 'Breaking Bad' Parody Methsical (previously known as Say My Name!) is a 2018 parody musical with music, lyrics and book by Rob Gathercole based on AMC's Breaking Bad created by Vince Gilligan. The story shows down-on-his-luck father and chemistry teacher, Walter White's descent into the world of drug dealing as he becomes the feared druglord "Heisenberg". The musical condenses the entire plot of Breaking Bad down to approximately 90 minutes with a heightened sense of camp and satire. Production began in 2018 when Gathercole created a Kickstarter to help fund the project and raised £1,877 of the £1,500 goal.

The production was met with generally positive reviews with most reviewers commenting on Gathercole's writing.

== Synopsis ==
=== Season 1 ===
In the middle of the desert, awaiting his arrest, Walter White begins recording a message for his family but stops mid-way through to do a second take. ("Pilot" [Take One]) We are taken 3 weeks earlier as the ensemble explains how he came to this point. They describe his difficult life, working 2 jobs to support his pregnant wife, Skyler, and his disabled son, "Teenie Weenie" Walter Jr. On the day of his 50th birthday, he is diagnosed with lung cancer but hides it from his family. Later at his party, Walt's brother-in-law Hank Schrader, a DEA agent, invites him on a drug bust where he sees former student Jesse Pinkman escape. Walt decides then to start cooking meth to make money for his cancer. (The Ballad Of Walter White [Take Two]) Later that night Walt goes to Jesse's house and convinces him to cook meth with him. (Break Bad With Me) A few days later, a drug deal with Jesse's former dealer, Krazy-8, goes wrong and Walt is forced to kill him to save himself. (I Could Kill Him/Walter's Idea) Walt gets home late much to Skyler's annoyance so he is forced to tell her he has cancer. While initially distressed about the cost of medication, Skyler tells Walt to ask his rich friends Elliot and Gretchen Schwartz for help with the costs. Walt is initially hesitant due to their poor history but eventually comes around to the idea. (Honesty) Hank explains the importance of the DEA and their role in society. (D.E.A)

=== Season 2 ===
A few weeks later Walt and Jesse are kidnapped by their psychotic distributor, Tuco Salamanca, and taken to a house in the desert. (Road Trip Song [Tuco, Tuco!]) At the house, Walt plans to kill Tuco using ricin but they are spotted by Tuco's disabled uncle, Hector Salamanca. Hector (who can only communicate with a bell strapped to his wheelchair) alerts Tuco forcing Jesse to shoot Tuco so they can escape. Hank also unexpectedly shows up forcing Walt and Jesse to hide. Hank shoots Tuco, killing him. (Tio and Tuco) To avoid suspicion from his family Walt feigns having a fugue state. (The Ballad of Walter White [Reprise 1]) When he is reunited with his family, he denies any knowledge of having a second cell phone. (Honesty [Reprise 1]). A few weeks later one of Walt's distributors is arrested. To help avoid any further run-ins with the police Walt and Jesse hire sleazy TV lawyer Saul Goodman. (Comedy Lawyer) Gretchen asks to speak with Walt after finding out that he has been lying about them paying for his treatment. The argument becomes heated when Walt claims the Schwartzes cut him out of Grey Matter with both parties cursing each other out. (Sorry Gretchen) While Jesse is hanging out with his girlfriend Jane Margolis he rants about Walt. He wants to smoke heroin to calm down but Jane tells him not to and about what she learned in rehab. Jesse decides to split the heroin with Jane and they both get high. (Jesse's Rap) Meanwhile, Walt asks Skyler to promise she won't have sex with her boss Ted Beneke. (Honesty [Reprise 2]) A few weeks later Saul sets up a meeting between Walt and high-end distributor Gus Fring who also runs the Los Pollos Hermanos restaurant chain. Gus decides to let Walt cook meth for him. (Don't Be a Chicken) Later at night, Walt breaks into Jesse's house and finds Jane overdosing. Walt decides not to help her as he fears his control over Jesse is loosening due to his relationship. (Should I Help Her?) Skyler discovers Walt's second cell phone and thinks he's dealing marijuana. When she confronts him over this, he is disappointed she would think so low of him, and he reveals he has instead been dealing meth. Walt and Skyler divorce. (I Think My Husband's Been Dealing...)

=== Season 3 ===
A mariachi band explains the entirety of the third season. Walt gets a new lab partner, Gale Boetticher, whom he dislikes. He also refuses to leave his house forcing Skyler to sleep with Ted. Hank is stalked and almost killed by Tuco's cousins but he manages to kill them instead, becoming paralyzed in the process. Jesse finds out some of the people working under Gus use children to sell meth so Walt kills them, enraging Gus. Gus threatens to kill Walt and Jesse but Jesse kills Gale, ensuring their continued partnership with Gus (Season Three)

=== Season 4 ===
Walt's family visits Hank for dinner and Hank reveals he has started a mineral collection, much to the dismay of the other characters. (Minerals #1) At the dinner, Walt implies that Heisenberg may still be alive when Hank tells him they suspect Gale. Skyler gets mad at Walt and implies he is scared and wants to get caught. Enraged, Walt egotistically tells her that he should not fear danger but that he has so much power others should fear him instead. (Danger) Gus kills all the higher-ups of the Mexican cartel and plans on visiting Hector to kill him too. (Don't Be a Chicken [Reprise 1]) As the ensemble begins singing about Walt giving up, Walt shuts them up and tells them that Walter White is dead and to refer to him as Heisenberg from now on. (The Ballad of Walter White [Reprise 2]) Walt meets with Hector and they create a plan to kill Gus. Hector will go to the DEA forcing Gus to investigate. When Gus visits Hector he will use his bell to set off a bomb strapped to the wheelchair, killing Gus and Hector in the process. (The Chicken Man) Their plan goes exactly as expected and Gus is killed. Walt and Jesse celebrate their victory over Gus. (Don't Be a Chicken [Reprise 2])

=== Season 5A ===
Walt and Jesse convince one of Gus' men, Mike Ehrmantraut, to help in their new operation now that Gus is dead. (Break Bad With Three) Hank is promoted to ASAC and dedicates himself to catching Heisenberg. (D.E.A. - Reprise) Walt, Jesse, and Mike make plans to take over a rival drug operation run in Phoenix by a man named Declan. Declan, insulted by Walt's proposition asks who he is. Walt tells him that he knows exactly who he is. (Plan) Walt boasts about his accomplishments since he started dealing meth, leading Declan to realize he is the now legendary Heisenberg. (Say My Name!) Later that day, Mike and Walt get into a heated argument over Mike not giving Walt the names of men who worked for Gus. When Mike calls Walt a "bad man" Walt shoots him in rage. As Mike dies Walt realizes he could get the names from another associate of Gus, Lydia Rodarte-Quayle. Lydia gladly gives the names to Walt and Walt briefly debates killing them before going ahead with it. (Should I Kill Them?) Walt is confronted by Skyler who begs him to leave the business in return for fixing their family. Walt finally decides to give up and retires from cooking meth. (Honesty [Reprise 3])

=== Season 5B ===
At Walt's house, Hank accidentally discovers Walt is Heisenberg when he reads a book Walt received from Gale. Hank confronts Walt over this but Walt completely denies his allegations. He says that his cancer has returned meaning Hank wouldn't even have someone to catch if he pursued him. Hank doesn't care and still chooses to pursue this lead. (Hank and Walt) Hank brings Jesse in for investigation but Jesse refuses to talk. Hank threatens to begin singing about minerals which causes Jesse to confess immediately. (Minerals #2) Hank tricks Walt into going to the desert where he can arrest him but the neo-Nazi group Walt used to kill Gus' men follow him out. Walt begs for Jack Welker, the leader of the group, to spare Hank's life in exchange for the $8 million Walt has in the desert. Hank refuses to accept so Jack allows Hank to speak his final words, his mineral song, before shooting him. (Minerals #3) Walt is forced to gain a new identity and move to New Hampshire to avoid arrest. After some months, Walt sees Elliot and Gretchen on a TV claiming Walt had very little to do with the founding of Grey Matter, enraging Walt. He also finds out Jack's gang has yet to kill Jesse and are using him to cook meth, convincing him to return to Albuquerque. Walt first visits the Schwartzes and forces them to give his son $9 million with the alternative being death. Walt next visits his family to say goodbye. Skyler begs Walt to not say he did it for his family and Walt admits he did it all for his own enjoyment. Finally, Walt goes to Jack to rescue Jesse. When Walt inquires why Jack even needs the money he says he wishes to run for president of the United States. Jack threatens to kill Walt but Walt requests that he can play his guitar one last time. (Final Sequence) While playing the guitar Walt and Jesse telepathically communicate and Walt tells Jesse to duck on his command. When he finishes playing Walt reveals the guitar is actually an activator for a mounted gun that kills the neo-Nazis, fatally injuring Walt in the process. (Walt's Guitar Solo/The Killing of the Nazis) Walt solemnly sings about chemistry before succumbing to his injuries. The ensemble return to question if he was good or bad, ending on the note that inside we are all like Walter White to some extent. (Chemistry/The Ballad of Walter White)

== Roles and principal cast ==
Character	Theater N18	Turbine Theater
Character	2018	2023
Walter White	Matt Tweddle	Richard Costello
Skyler White	Olivia Warren	Natalie Winsor
Jesse Pinkman	Rebecca Levy	Nikki Biddington
Hank Schrader	Scott Brooks	Rob Gathercole
Gustavo Fring	Edward Hole	Natalie Winsor
Saul Goodman	Rob Gathercole	Rob Gathercole
Lydia Rodarte-Quayle	Olivia Warren	
Gretchen Schwartz	Rebecca Levy	Nikki Biddington
Tuco Salamanca	Edward Hole	Natalie Winsor
Jane Margolis	Edward Hole	Rob Gathercole

== Musical numbers ==
The following is a list of songs as they appear on the cast recording.

Act I

- "Pilot" (Take One) - Walter
- The Ballad of Walter White (Take Two) - Walter, Skyler, Hank, Jesse, and Ensemble
- Break Bad With Me - Walter and Jesse
- I Could Kill Him/Walter's Idea - Walter and Jesse
- Honesty - Walter, Skyler, and Walter Jr
- D.E.A. - Hank and Ensemble
- Road Trip Song (Tuco, Tuco!) - Tuco, Walter and Jesse
- Tio and Tuco - Tuco and Walter
- The Ballad of Walter White (Reprise 1) - Ensemble
- Honesty (Reprise 1) - Walter and Skyler
- Comedy Lawyer - Saul, Walter, and Jesse
- Sorry Gretchen - Walter and Gretchen
- Jesse's Rap - Jesse and Jane
- Honesty (Reprise 2) - Skyler, Walter, Jesse, and Jane
- Don't Be a Chicken - Gustavo and Walter
- Should I Help Her? - Walter
- I Think My Husband's Been Dealing... - Skyler, Gretchen and Walter

Act II

- Season Three - Ensemble
- Minerals #1 - Hank and Walter
- Danger - Skyler and Walter
- Don't Be a Chicken (Reprise 1) - Gustavo and Ensemble
- The Ballad of Walter White (Reprise 2) - Ensemble and Walter
- The Chicken Man - Walter
- Don't Be a Chicken (Reprise 2) - Gustavo, Walter, and Jesse
- Break Bad With Three - Walter, Jesse, and Mike† *
- D.E.A. (Reprise) - Hank and Ensemble†
- Plan - Walter, Jesse, Mike, and Declan
- Say My Name! - Walter and Ensemble
- Should I Kill Them? - Mike, Walter, and Lydia†
- Honesty (Reprise 3) - Skyler and Walter
- Hank and Walt - Hank and Walter
- Minerals #2 - Hank and Jesse
- Minerals #3 - Jack, Walter, and Hank
- Final Sequence - Full Cast
- Walt's Guitar Solo/The Killing of the Nazis - Walter, Jesse, and Jack
- Chemistry/The Ballad of Walter White - Walter and Ensemble
- El Camino‡ - Jesse
- ???‡ - Hank

*The song "Break Bad With Three" was removed from the show during rewrites following the release of the cast recording. The song "Where We Gonna Cook?" has been put in its place for all future productions.

Keys

- † Not present in the current version of the show
- ‡ Cast Recording Only

=== Recordings ===
A cast recording was released on streaming platforms on 2 November 2019 and also as a physical release for sale at the official Breaking Bad Store in Albuquerque, New Mexico. The cast recording contained two extra songs, a song detailing the events of El Camino: A Breaking Bad Movie and another song of Hank listing various names with the initials W.W.

== Reception ==
=== Critical reception ===
In its first showing in London, Say My Name was met with generally positive reviews with most reviewers commenting on the humor of Gathercole's writing. Lani Calvert of musicaltheatrereview.com called it "an excellent addition to London’s Fringe theatre scene" Laura Thomas of LondonTheatre1 highly recommended the show and gave it 5 stars calling Gathercole's writing "of the highest quality, executed with panache and vigour". Mims Melville of Musical Theatre Musings gave the show 4 of 5 stars, particularly commenting on the energy of the cast throughout the performance. Isla Robinson of North West End called the show "hilarious and highly entertaining" although recommended cutting some songs for time. This sentiment was shared by Alex Finch of Comedy To Watch, who also called for future productions to portray characters of color with actors of color.
