= Vince Gilligan =

American writer, director, and producer (born 1967)

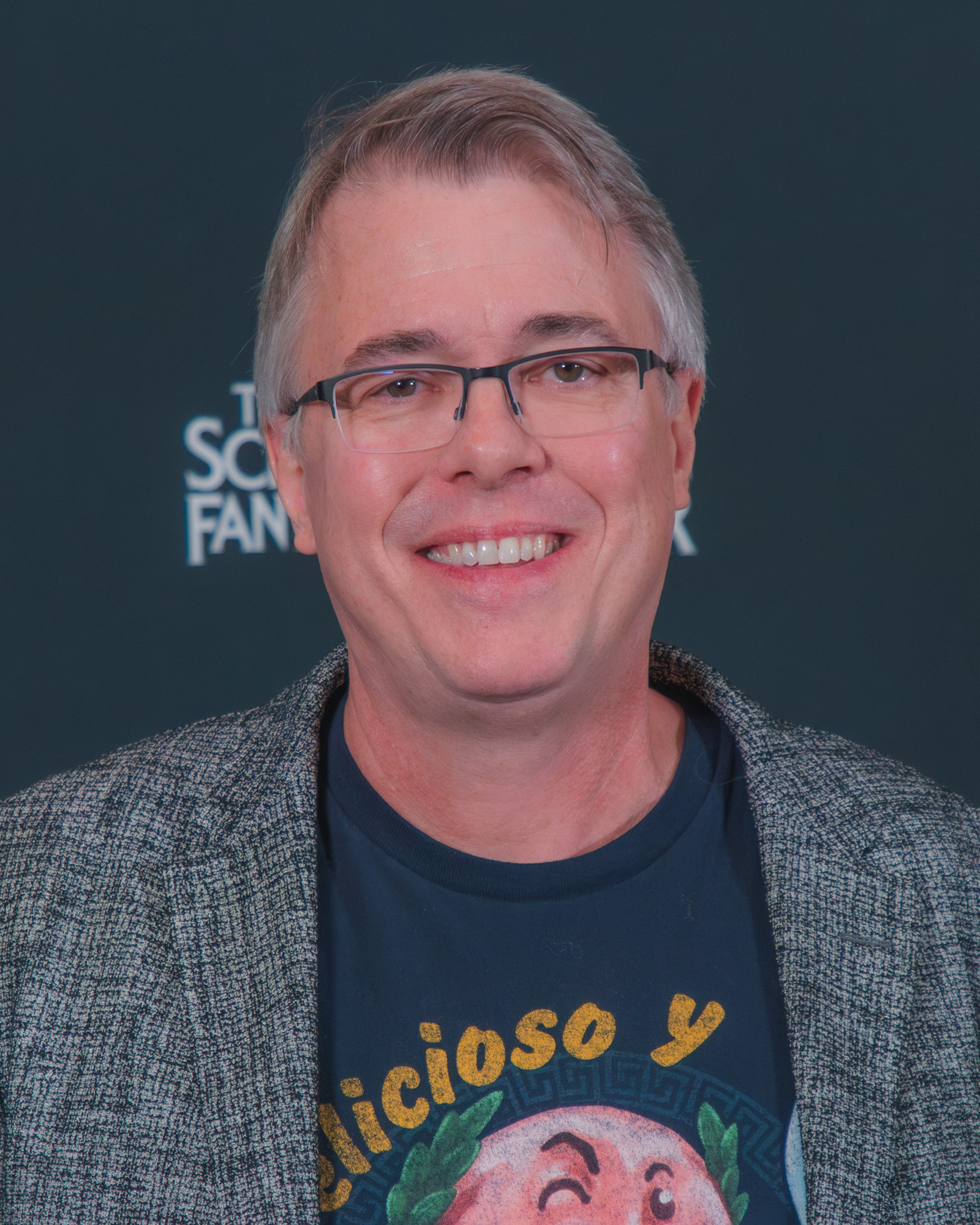
- Gilligan in 2026
- Born: George Vincent Gilligan Jr. February 10, 1967 (age 59); Richmond, Virginia, U.S.
- Education: New York University (BFA)
- Occupations: Screenwriter; director; producer; showrunner
- Years active: 1992–present
- Notable work: Breaking Bad; Better Call Saul; Pluribus; The X-Files; Hancock

George Vincent Gilligan Jr. (born February 10, 1967) is an American screenwriter, producer, and director. He is the creator, showrunner, and executive producer of the AMC crime series Breaking Bad (2008–2013) and its spin-off prequel series Better Call Saul (2015–2022). He has received numerous accolades, including five Primetime Emmy Awards, six Writers Guild of America Awards, two Critics' Choice Television Awards, two Producers Guild of America Awards, a Directors Guild of America Award, and a BAFTA Television Award.

Gilligan's other work includes writing, directing, and producing some episodes of the Fox science fiction series The X-Files (1993–2002) and co-creating its spin-off series The Lone Gunmen (2001), co-writing the screenplay for the superhero film Hancock (2008), and writing, directing, and producing the Breaking Bad sequel film El Camino (2019). He is also the creator, primary writer, and executive producer of the Apple TV science fiction series Pluribus (2025–present).

== Early life ==
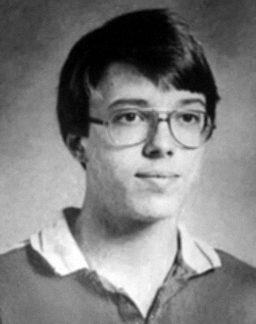
Gilligan's high school portrait

George Vincent Gilligan Jr. was born in Richmond, Virginia, on February 10, 1967, the son of grade school teacher Gail and insurance claims adjuster George Vincent Gilligan Sr. He was raised Catholic but later described himself as "pretty much agnostic". His parents divorced in 1974. He and his younger brother Patrick were raised in Farmville and Chesterfield County, where they attended J.P. Wynne Campus School, the laboratory school run by Longwood College (now Longwood University) where their mother also taught; Gilligan later used the J.P. Wynne name for the fictional high school where Walter White teaches in Breaking Bad. Gilligan's grandfather was Richmond book shop owner Vincent T. Gilligan.

Growing up, Gilligan was a close friend of Angus Wall, who became a film editor and title designer. His interest in film began when Wall's mother Jackie, who also taught at J.P. Wynne, loaned Gilligan her Super 8 film camera. He used the camera to produce amateur science fiction films with Patrick. One of his first films was entitled Space Wreck, starring Patrick in the lead role. One year later, he won first prize for his age group in a film competition at the University of Virginia. Jackie took Wall and Gilligan to Richmond and dropped them off at Cloverleaf Mall to see films, encouraging both of them to pursue a career in the arts. Gilligan later said, "I wouldn't be where I am today if it weren't for Jackie. She was a wonderful lady and a real inspiration."

Gilligan was recognized at an early age for his talents and creativity. His father described him as a "kind of a studious-type young man, and he liked to read, and he had a vivid imagination". He introduced Gilligan to film noir classics, as well as John Wayne and Clint Eastwood Westerns on late-night television. Gilligan won a scholarship to attend the prestigious Interlochen Center for the Arts. After eighth grade, he moved back to Chesterfield to attend L. C. Bird High School. After graduating in 1985, he went on to attend NYU's Tisch School of the Arts on a scholarship, receiving a BFA in film production. While at NYU, he wrote the screenplay for Home Fries and received the Virginia Governor's Screenwriting Award in 1989 for the screenplay, which was later turned into a film. One of the judges of the competition was film producer Mark Johnson, who was impressed by Gilligan and called him "the most imaginative writer" he had ever read. Gilligan also studied holography under Jason Sapan at Holographic Studios in New York City.

== Career ==
=== The X-Files and The Lone Gunmen ===
Gilligan's big break came when he joined the Fox television drama The X-Files. He was a fan of the show and submitted a script to Fox, which became the second-season episode "Soft Light". He went on to write 29 more episodes, in addition to being co-executive producer of 44 episodes, executive producer of 40, co-producer of 24, and supervising producer of 20. He also co-created and became executive producer of the spin-off series The Lone Gunmen, which ran for one season of 13 episodes.

=== Breaking Bad, Better Call Saul, and El Camino ===
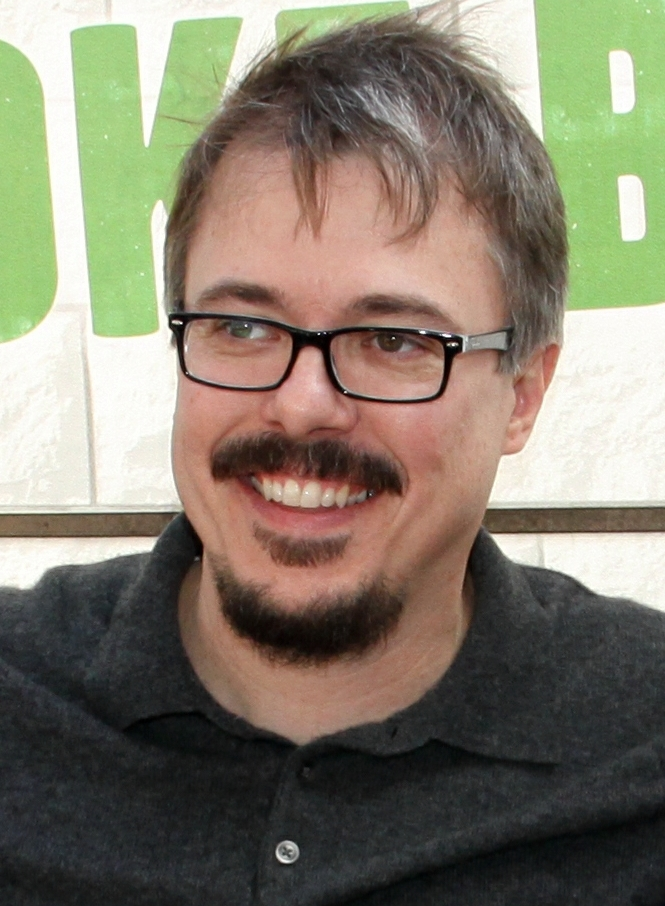
Gilligan in 2010

Gilligan created, wrote, directed, and produced the AMC drama series Breaking Bad, which premiered in 2008 and concluded in 2013. It gave rise to the wider Breaking Bad franchise. He created the series with the premise that the hero would become the villain, stating, "Television is historically good at keeping its characters in a self-imposed stasis so that shows can go on for years or even decades. When I realized this, the logical next step was to think, 'How can I do a show in which the fundamental drive is toward change?'" He added that his goal with Walter White was to turn him from "Mr. Chips into Scarface". While pitching the show to studios, Gilligan was initially discouraged when he learned of the existing series Weeds and its similarities to the premise of Breaking Bad. While his producers convinced him that the show was different enough to still be successful, he later said he would not have gone forward with the idea had he known about Weeds earlier.

Breaking Bad received widespread critical acclaim and has been praised by many critics as being among the greatest television dramas of all time. Gilligan won numerous awards for his work on the series. The Writers Guild of America awarded him four times in straight succession, from 2012 to 2014: three as a part of the Breaking Bad writing team and one individually for writing the episode "Box Cutter". He also received two Primetime Emmys in 2013 and 2014 for producing the show. In 2014, he won the Directors Guild of America Award for Outstanding Directing in a Drama Series for directing the show's final episode "Felina".

In September 2013, Sony Pictures Television announced a deal with AMC to produce a Breaking Bad spin-off prequel entitled Better Call Saul, focusing on Breaking Bad supporting character Saul Goodman before he became Walter's lawyer, and to star Bob Odenkirk reprising his role as Saul. Gilligan co-created the series with Breaking Bad writer Peter Gould, with both of them acting as showrunners. The first episode "Uno", which Gilligan directed and co-wrote, premiered on February 8, 2015. He left the Better Call Saul writing staff early in the third season to focus on other projects, resulting in Gould becoming sole showrunner, a transition which had been planned since the show's debut. Gilligan remained involved in Better Call Saul's production in a reduced role, directing episodes in the fourth and fifth seasons before returning to the writers' room in the sixth.

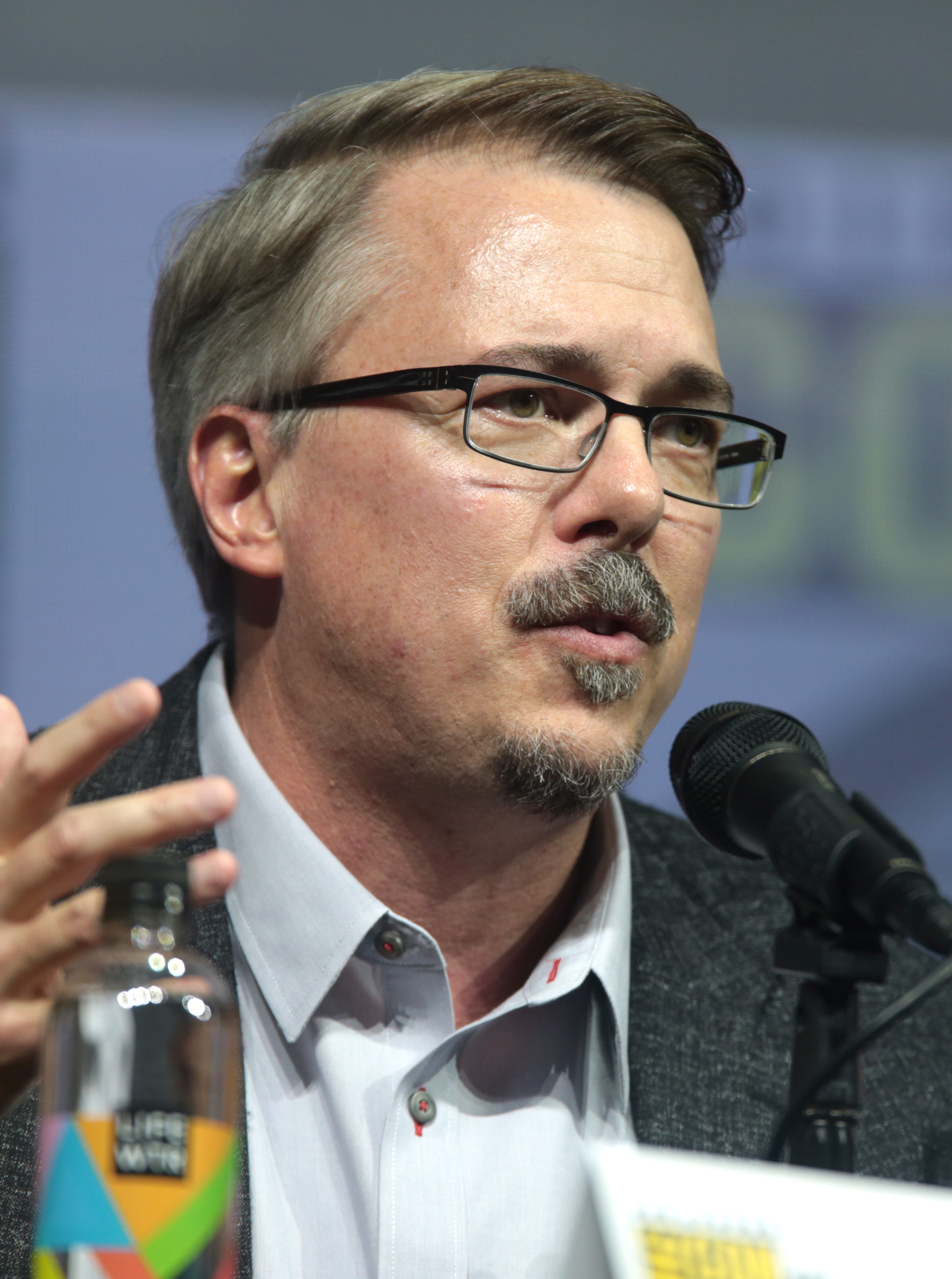
Gilligan in 2018

In July 2018, it was announced that Gilligan had agreed to stay with Sony TV on a new three-year deal. His deal with Sony via his own production company, High Bridge Productions, was renewed in 2021.

After stepping down as showrunner and leaving the writers room for Better Call Saul, Gilligan quietly developed the script for El Camino: A Breaking Bad Movie, which wraps up the story of Breaking Bad co-protagonist Jesse Pinkman following the events of "Felina", ahead of the show's tenth anniversary. He subsequently directed and produced the film, which was released in a limited theatrical screening and on Netflix in October 2019.

Breaking Bad, Better Call Saul, and El Camino, along with various short-form web series associated with these series, have been described informally by the shows' staff and fans as the "Gilliverse". Following the finale of Better Call Saul, Gilligan said that he does not plan to create any more works related to Breaking Bad.

=== Battle Creek ===
In September 2013, Sony struck a deal with CBS to produce a new series created by Gilligan and David Shore called Battle Creek. Based on a script written by Gilligan a decade prior, the show follows two police detectives who must compete with a seemingly perfect FBI agent. Gilligan co-wrote the first episode with Shore, who served as showrunner of the series. CBS ordered 13 episodes and the series aired on CBS starting March 1, 2015, but it was not renewed for a second season.

=== Pluribus ===
After Better Call Saul finished, Gilligan began working on a new show titled Pluribus, a science fiction series that has been compared to The X-Files and The Twilight Zone. The show, initially under working title Wycaro 339, received a two-season order from Apple TV+ in September 2022, with confirmation that Rhea Seehorn, who played Kim Wexler on Better Call Saul, would star. The series premiered in 2025.

=== Other work ===
==== Film ====
Gilligan first had a screenplay produced in 1993 for the romantic comedy film Wilder Napalm. While working on The X-Files, one of his early screenplays was produced in 1998 as Home Fries, which starred Drew Barrymore and Luke Wilson. He also rewrote the screenplay for the 2008 Will Smith film Hancock, which was originally written by Vincent Ngo.

==== Television ====
Gilligan was hired by The X-Files creator Chris Carter to be a consulting producer on his new series Harsh Realm. After The X-Files, he wrote an episode of the short lived police procedural series Robbery Homicide Division and an episode of the ABC series Night Stalker.

In 2014, Gilligan had a cameo role in the "VCR Maintenance and Educational Publishing" episode of the NBC comedy series Community as a cheesy actor hosting Pile of Bullets, a fictional 1990s VCR-based video game.

==== Unreleased projects ====
In 2007, Gilligan and fellow X-Files producer Frank Spotnitz wrote a sci-fi pilot entitled A.M.P.E.D., which was not picked up for a full series.

In 2016, it was announced that Gilligan would develop an HBO limited miniseries about Jim Jones and the 1978 Jonestown tragedy. The series would be based on the 1982 non-fiction book Raven: The Untold Story of the Rev. Jim Jones and His People, and would be co-produced by Octavia Spencer and Gilligan's longtime collaborator Michelle MacLaren. However, in 2018, Gilligan said that he had slowed down on developing the project.

== Personal life ==
Gilligan has never been married. He has been in a relationship with Holly Rice since 1991. He referred to her as his longtime partner at the 2025 WGA West Awards.

Gilligan was raised Catholic but now identifies as agnostic, and has said that he finds it "hard to wrap [his] head around" both Christian fundamentalism and atheism.

Gilligan has denounced the use of AI in the arts, calling it "the world's most expensive and energy-intensive plagiarism machine". In a 2025 interview with Polygon, he said, "I have not used ChatGPT, because as of yet, no one has held a shotgun to my head and made me do it. I will never use it."

== Filmography ==
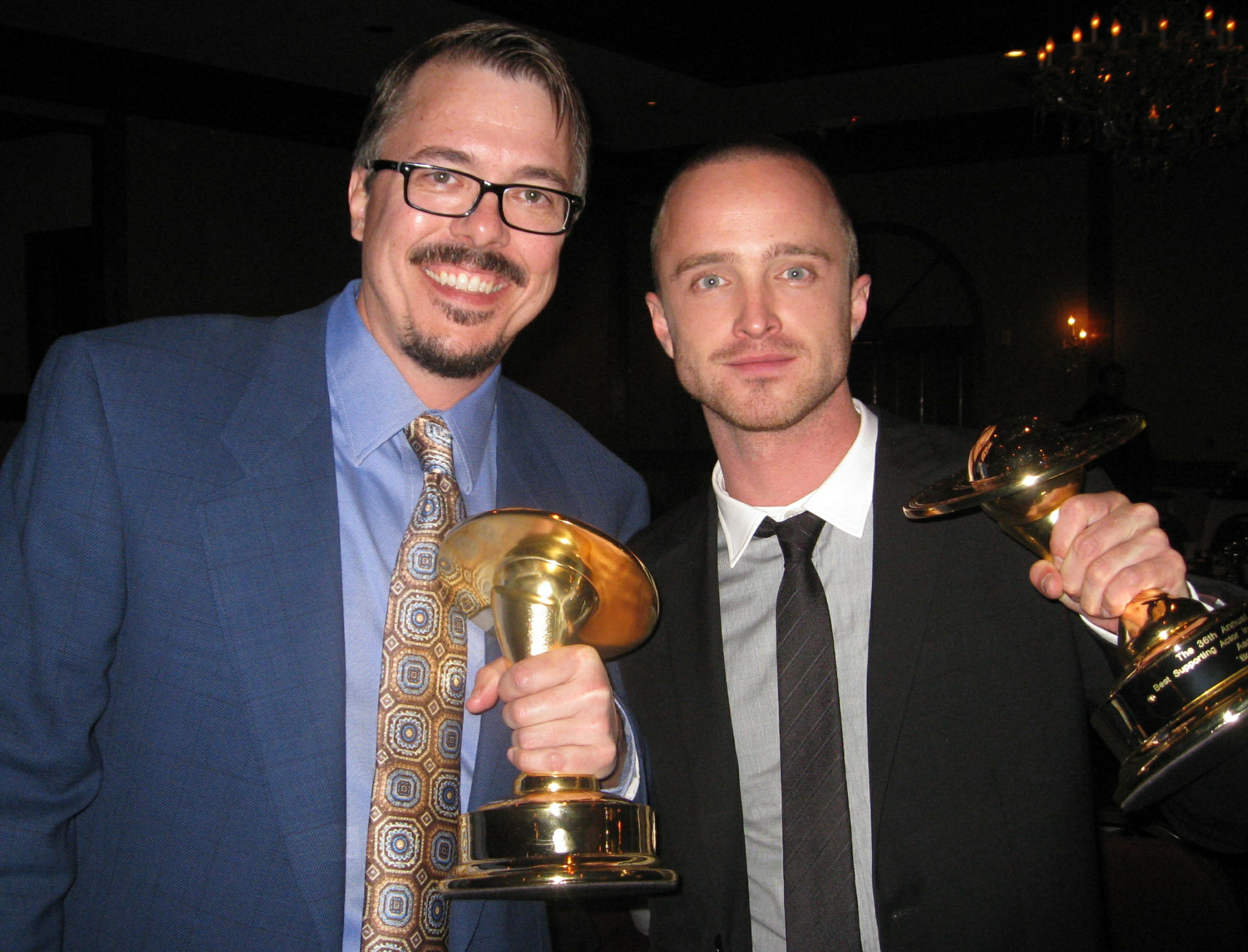
Gilligan and Aaron Paul in June 2010

=== Film ===
Year	Title	Director	Writer	Producer	Notes
1993	Wilder Napalm	No	Yes	No	
1998	Home Fries	No	Yes	No	
2008	Hancock	No	Yes	No	Co-written with Vincent Ngo
2019	El Camino: A Breaking Bad Movie	Yes	Yes	Yes	

=== Television ===
Year	Title	Creator	Director	Writer	Executive Producer	Notes
1995–2002	The X-Files	No	Yes	Yes	Yes	Also creative consultant, consulting producer, co-executive producer and co-producer
1999–2000	Harsh Realm	No	No	No	Consulting	
2001	The Lone Gunmen	Yes	No	Yes	Yes	Co-created with Chris Carter, John Shiban and Frank Spotnitz
2002	Robbery Homicide Division	No	No	Yes	No	
2005	The Night Stalker	No	No	Yes	No	
2007	A.M.P.E.D.	Yes	No	Yes	Yes	Pilot; Co-written with Frank Spotnitz
2008–2013	Breaking Bad	Yes	Yes	Yes	Yes	
2015–2022	Better Call Saul	Yes	Yes	Yes	Yes	Co-created with Peter Gould
2015	Battle Creek	Yes	No	Yes	Yes	Co-created with David Shore
2025–present	Pluribus	Yes	Yes	Yes	Yes	

==== Episode credits ====
Year	Title	Season	Episode	Episode title	Director	Writer	Notes
1995	The X-Files	2	23	"Soft Light"	No	Yes	
1996	The X-Files	3	17	"Pusher"	No	Yes	
1996	The X-Files	4	4	"Unruhe"	No	Yes	
1996	The X-Files	4	10	"Paper Hearts"	No	Yes	
1997	The X-Files	4	12	"Leonard Betts"	No	Yes	Co-written with John Shiban and Frank Spotnitz
1997	The X-Files	4	14	"Memento Mori"	No	Yes	Co-written with Chris Carter, Frank Spotnitz and John Shiban
1997	The X-Files	4	20	"Small Potatoes"	No	Yes	
1997	The X-Files	5	3	"Unusual Suspects"	No	Yes	
1997	The X-Files	5	6	"Christmas Carol"	No	Yes	Co-written with John Shiban and Frank Spotnitz
1997	The X-Files	5	7	"Emily"	No	Yes	Co-written with John Shiban and Frank Spotnitz
1998	The X-Files	5	8	"Kitsunegari"	No	Yes	Co-written with Tim Minear
1998	The X-Files	5	12	"Bad Blood"	No	Yes	
1998	The X-Files	5	19	"Folie a Deux"	No	Yes	
1998	The X-Files	6	2	"Drive"	No	Yes	
1998	The X-Files	6	4	"Dreamland"	No	Yes	Co-written with John Shiban and Frank Spotnitz
1998	The X-Files	6	5	"Dreamland II"	No	Yes	Co-written with John Shiban and Frank Spotnitz
1999	The X-Files	6	10	"Tithonus"	No	Yes	
1999	The X-Files	6	14	"Monday"	No	Yes	Co-written with John Shiban
1999	The X-Files	6	20	"Three of a Kind"	No	Yes	Co-written with John Shiban
1999	The X-Files	6	21	"Field Trip"	No	Yes	Teleplay co-written with John Shiban (story by Frank Spotnitz)
1999	The X-Files	7	3	"Hungry"	No	Yes	
1999	The X-Files	7	4	"Millennium"	No	Yes	Co-written with Frank Spotnitz
2000	The X-Files	7	8	"The Amazing Maleeni"	No	Yes	Co-written with John Shiban and Frank Spotnitz
2000	The X-Files	7	12	"X-Cops"	No	Yes	
2000	The X-Files	7	14	"Theef"	No	Yes	Co-written with John Shiban and Frank Spotnitz
2000	The X-Files	7	21	"Je Souhaite"	Yes	Yes	
2000	The X-Files	8	4	"Roadrunners"	No	Yes	
2001	The Lone Gunmen	1	1	"Pilot"	No	Yes	Co-written with Chris Carter, John Shiban and Frank Spotnitz
2001	The Lone Gunmen	1	2	"Bond, Jimmy Bond"	No	Yes	Co-written with John Shiban and Frank Spotnitz
2001	The Lone Gunmen	1	7	"Planet of the Frohikes"	No	Yes	
2001	The Lone Gunmen	1	8	"Maximum Byers"	No	Yes	Co-written with Frank Spotnitz
2001	The Lone Gunmen	1	12	"The Cap'n Toby Show"	No	Yes	Co-written with John Shiban and Frank Spotnitz
2001	The Lone Gunmen	1	13	"All About Yves"	No	Yes	Co-written with John Shiban and Frank Spotnitz
2002	The X-Files	9	7	"John Doe"	No	Yes	
2002	The X-Files	9	15	"Jump the Shark"	No	Yes	Co-written with John Shiban and Frank Spotnitz
2002	The X-Files	9	18	"Sunshine Days"	Yes	Yes	
2002	Robbery Homicide Division	1	4	"Free and Clear"	No	Yes	
2005	Night Stalker	1	10	"What's the Frequency, Kolchak?"	No	Yes	
2007	A.M.P.E.D.	Pilot			No	Yes	Unaired; Co-written with Frank Spotnitz
2008	Breaking Bad	1	1	"Pilot"	Yes	Yes	
2008	Breaking Bad	1	2	"Cat's in the Bag..."	No	Yes	
2008	Breaking Bad	1	3	"...And the Bag's in the River"	No	Yes	
2008	Breaking Bad	1	4	"Cancer Man"	No	Yes	
2009	Breaking Bad	2	6	"Peekaboo"	No	Yes	Co-written with J. Roberts
2009	Breaking Bad	2	13	"ABQ"	No	Yes	
2010	Breaking Bad	3	1	"No Más"	No	Yes	
2010	Breaking Bad	3	13	"Full Measure"	Yes	Yes	
2011	Breaking Bad	4	1	"Box Cutter"	No	Yes	
2011	Breaking Bad	4	12	"End Times"	Yes	No	
2011	Breaking Bad	4	13	"Face Off"	Yes	Yes	
2012	Breaking Bad	5	1	"Live Free or Die"	No	Yes	
2012	Breaking Bad	5	2	"Madrigal"	No	Yes	
2013	Breaking Bad	5	16	"Felina"	Yes	Yes	
2015	Battle Creek	1	1	"The Battle Creek Way"	No	Yes	Co-written with David Shore
2015	Better Call Saul	1	1	"Uno"	Yes	Yes	Co-written with Peter Gould
2016	Better Call Saul	2	10	"Klick"	Yes	Yes	Co-written with Heather Marion
2017	Better Call Saul	3	1	"Mabel"	Yes	Yes	Co-written with Peter Gould
2017	Better Call Saul	3	2	"Witness"	Yes	No	
2018	Better Call Saul	4	9	"Wiedersehen"	Yes	No	
2020	Better Call Saul	5	8	"Bagman"	Yes	No	
2022	Better Call Saul	6	2	"Carrot and Stick"	Yes	No	
2022	Better Call Saul	6	8	"Point and Shoot"	Yes	No	
2022	Better Call Saul	6	12	"Waterworks"	Yes	Yes	
2025	Pluribus	1	1	"We Is Us"	Yes	Yes	
2025	Pluribus	1	2	"Pirate Lady"	Yes	Yes	

==== Acting roles ====
Year	Title	Role	Notes
2014	Community	Devon / Pile of Bullets' Host	Episode "VCR Maintenance and Educational Publishing"
2015	Comedy Bang! Bang!	The Commissioner	Episode "Lil Jon Wears a Baseball Cap and Sunglasses"
2017	Penn Zero: Part-Time Hero	Axalon (voice)	Episode "Mr. Rippen"
2018	American Dad!	Himself (voice)	Episode "(You Gotta) Strike for Your Right"
2019	What Just Happened??! with Fred Savage	Himself	Episode “Spoiler”

== See also ==
- List of Primetime Emmy Award winners
- List of Golden Globe winners
