= Murder of Mirelle Hernández =

2021 murder of woman in Tijuana

- Location: Tijuana, Baja California, Mexico
- Date: December 5, 2021
- Attack type: Carjacking resulting in murder
- Deaths: 1
- No. of participants: 2

The murder of Mirelle Hernández, the result of a robbery and carjacking, happened on December 5, 2021, in Tijuana, Baja California, Mexico. She was a makeup artist for film and television and the niece of Juan Manuel Hernández Niebla who is part of the National Public Security Council in Tijuana.

== Carjacking and murder ==
On the evening of Sunday, December 5, 2021, Hernández had just finished working at a film set and was outside a restaurant when two men took her bag. She attempted to intervene by standing in front of her blue Jeep Cherokee, but the perpetrators started her vehicle and ran her over, dragging her to the nearby Tijuana-Rosarito highway.

Emergency services found her near the highway and transported her to Clinic 20 at the Mexican Social Security Institute. Shortly after arriving, Hernández died due to traumatic injuries to her head.

== Mirelle Hernández ==
Mirelle Hernández
- Hernández in 2017
- Born: Mirelle A. Hernández; July 4, 1975; San Diego, California, U.S.
- Died: December 5, 2021 (aged 46); Tijuana, Baja California, Mexico
- Occupation: Makeup artist
- Notable credits: Narcos: México; Fear the Walking Dead; Ingobernable; Tijuana
- Relatives: Juan Manuel Hernández Niebla (uncle)

Mirelle A. Hernández (July 4, 1975 – December 5, 2021), a resident of Chula Vista, California, was a makeup artist who worked on the television shows Narcos: México, Fear the Walking Dead, Ingobernable and Tijuana. At the time of her death, she was 45 years old. Juan Manuel Hernández Niebla is her uncle who is a member of the National Public Security Council in Tijuana.

Filmography
Year	Title	Notes
2016-2017	Fear the Walking Dead	Uncredited, makeup artist, 28 episodes
2017	Ingobernable	Key makeup artist, 15 episodes
2018	Narcos: México	Uncredited, makeup and hair, 4 episodes
2019	Miss Bala	Special makeup effects artist
2019	Tijuana	11 episodes
2019	9-1-1	Assistant makeup artist, Episode: "Sink or Swim"
2019	Como caído del cielo	Makeup artist
2020	The Rescue	Hair stylist
2020	Desperados	Makeup artist: Los Cabos
2020	Seized	Makeup artist
2021	Coyote	Assistant makeup artist, 6 episodes
2022	This Is Not America	Posthumous release, makeup artist/sfx, Residente music video
2022	The Drop	Posthumous release
2022	Touch	Posthumous release, special makeup effects artist
2022	Black Warrant	Posthumous release
