= Tijuana (disambiguation) =

Tijuana is a city in Baja California, Mexico.

Tijuana may also refer to:

- Tijuana Municipality
- Tijuana metropolitan area
- Tijuana Ricks (born 1978), African-American actress
- Tijuana River
- Tijuana (TV series), 2019 Netflix series
- Tijuana (Tijuana Panthers EP), 2008
- "Tijuana", a song by J. J. Cale from the album Travel-Log (1989)

== See also ==
- Playas de Tijuana
- Tijuana River Estuary
- Tijuana Cartel
