= Our Flag Means Death =

2022 American television series

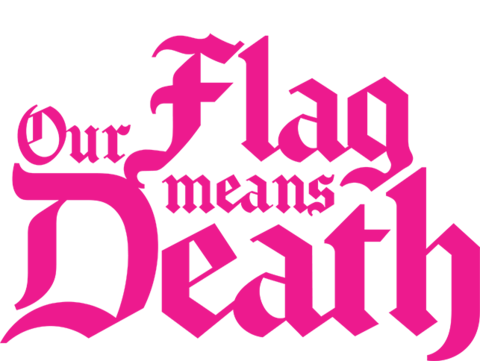
- Genre: Romantic comedy; Swashbuckler
- Created by: David Jenkins
- Starring: Rhys Darby; Ewen Bremner; Joel Fry; Samson Kayo; Nathan Foad; Vico Ortiz; Matthew Maher; Kristian Nairn; Rory Kinnear; Con O'Neill; Guz Khan; David Fane; Taika Waititi; Samba Schutte
- Theme music composer: Mark Mothersbaugh
- Country of origin: United States
- Original language: English
- No. of seasons: 2
- No. of episodes: 18

Production
- Executive producers: Garrett Basch; Dan Halsted; David Jenkins; Taika Waititi
- Producers: Todd King; Allen Marshall Palmer
- Cinematography: Mike Berlucchi; Cynthia Pusheck
- Editors: Christian Kinnard; Hilda Rasula; Daniel Haworth; Gina Samsom
- Running time: 26–36 minutes
- Production companies: Waititi; Human Animals; CereProds; Dive

Original release
- Network: HBO Max
- Release: March 3 – March 24, 2022
- Network: Max
- Release: October 5 – October 26, 2023

Our Flag Means Death is an American period romantic comedy television series created by David Jenkins. Set in 1717 during the Golden Age of Piracy, the series follows the misadventures of gentleman-turned-pirate Stede Bonnet (Rhys Darby) and his crew aboard the Revenge as they try to make a name for themselves as pirates and cross paths with famed pirate captain Blackbeard (Taika Waititi).

The first season premiered in March 2022 on HBO Max and the second season premiered in October 2023 on the renamed Max streaming service. The series was canceled in January 2024 after two seasons.

Despite a subdued launch, the series gradually gained word-of-mouth momentum and became a sleeper hit with a cult following. Its growth in popularity has been compared to the success of Ted Lasso. Since its release, the series has been regarded as one of the best and most beloved examples of LGBTQ+ media.

Our Flag Means Death garnered critical acclaim, including praise for its LGBTQ+ representation. Critics consider the series to be one of the best sitcoms of the 2020s. The series won an Art Directors Guild Award, a Make-Up Artists and Hair Stylists Guild Award, an Australian Production Design Guild Award, a New Zealand Television Award, and was named one of the top ten TV series that represent the best in humanity by the Greater Good Science Center. The series also earned Peabody Award, Nebula Award, Hollywood Critics Association Award, Dorian TV Award, and GLAAD Media Award nominations.

== Premise ==
The series is loosely based on the life of Stede Bonnet, also known as the "Gentleman Pirate". Set in 1717, the first season depicts the early days of Bonnet's career as a pirate after abandoning his family and his comfortable life as a member of the landed gentry of Barbados. Bonnet is portrayed as having little or no aptitude for this role, with no experience beyond that of his privileged life.

Aboard their ship, the Revenge, the newly minted Captain Bonnet and his dysfunctional crew struggle to survive against deadly threats both from naval warships and other bloodthirsty pirates. During their misadventures, the crew of the Revenge cross paths with notorious pirate captain Edward Teach and his crew, including First Mate Izzy Hands. Comedy and chaos ensue as Teach and Bonnet fall in love.

== Cast and characters ==
=== Main ===
- Rhys Darby as Stede Bonnet, a wealthy Barbadian landowner, who has grown tired of his sedentary life and unhappy marriage and abandoned his family to begin a life of piracy despite having no aptitude for it. After purchasing a ship and hiring a crew, he seeks to brand himself as the Gentleman Pirate. Rhys Darby's son Theo Darby portrays Stede Bonnet as a child.
- Ewen Bremner as Nathaniel Buttons, the grizzled first mate on the Revenge whom Stede often calls upon for advice and who is capable of talking with seagulls.
- Joel Fry as Frenchie, a crewmate on the Revenge who often sings of the crew's adventures.
- Samson Kayo as Oluwande Boodhari, a level-headed crewmate on the Revenge who is sympathetic to Stede and tries to steer him away from danger.
- Nathan Foad as Lucius Spriggs, a scribe on the Revenge tasked with keeping a record of its adventures who often helps Stede come to terms with his feelings.
- Vico Ortiz as Jim Jimenez, a skilled fighter who has a bounty on their head for killing one of Spanish Jackie's husbands.
- Matthew Maher as Black Pete, an irritable pirate aboard the Revenge who claims to have crewed with Blackbeard.
- Kristian Nairn as Wee John Feeney, a crewmate on the Revenge obsessed with fire.
- Rory Kinnear as Captain Nigel Badminton (season 1), a Royal Navy officer who bullied Stede when they were children. Kinnear also portrays Nigel's twin brother, Admiral Chauncey Badminton.
- Con O'Neill as Israel "Izzy" Hands, Blackbeard's ruthless first mate who has served under him for many years.
- Guz Khan as Ivan (season 1), a member of Blackbeard's crew who joins him on the Revenge.
- David Fane as Kevin / Fang, an emotional member of Blackbeard's crew who joins him on the Revenge.
- Taika Waititi as Edward "Ed" Teach / Blackbeard, the legendary and feared pirate captain who has become bored with his life and career, feeling that his reputation has made it too easy.
- Samba Schutte as Roach (season 2; recurring season 1), a cleaver-wielding cook and doctor on the Revenge.

=== Recurring ===
- Nat Faxon as The Swede, a Swedish crewmate on the Revenge, often clueless of what's going on.
- Claudia O'Doherty as Mary Bonnet (season 1), Stede's wife.
- Boris McGiver as Father Bonnet (season 1), Stede's emotionally abusive father.
- William Barber-Holler as Louis Bonnet (season 1), Stede and Mary's son.
- Eden Grace Redfield as Alma Bonnet (season 1), Stede and Mary's daughter.
- Michael Patrick Crane as Officer Wellington (season 1), a Royal Navy officer who is taken hostage by Stede's crew.
- Connor Barrett as Officer Hornberry (season 1), a Royal Navy officer who is taken hostage by Stede's crew.
- Leslie Jones as Spanish Jackie, a powerful and feared pirate bar owner in the Republic of Pirates who has had 19 husbands.
- Fred Armisen as Geraldo (season 1), a shifty barkeep in the Republic of Pirates and one of Jackie's husbands.
- Madeleine Sami as Archie (season 2), a new member of Blackbeard's crew who forms a close bond with Jim.
- Ruibo Qian as Zheng Yi Sao (season 2), the pirate queen of China and captain of an all-female ship, the Red Flag, who initially masquerades as Susan, a soup seller.
- Anapela Polataivao as Auntie (season 2), the first mate and navigator for Zheng Yi Sao's crew.
- Erroll Shand as Richard "Ricky" Banes (season 2), a prince of minor nobility who became inspired by Stede to embrace the pirate lifestyle, but later leads an anti-piracy campaign after his attempt at becoming a pirate leaves him without a nose.

=== Guest ===
- Gary Farmer as Chief Mabo (season 1), an indigenous leader who is wary of colonizers.
- Benton Jennings as an Anglican priest (season 1), who droningly performs Mary and Stede's marriage ceremony near a lighthouse.
- Nick Kroll as Gabriel (season 1), a French aristocrat and Antoinette's partner/brother.
- Kristen Schaal as Antoinette (season 1), a French aristocrat and Gabriel's partner/sister.
- Brian Gattas as Siegfried (season 1), a German aristocrat.
- Yvonne Zima as Fleur de Maguis (season 1), a French aristocrat.
- Angus Sampson as George I (season 1), the King of Great Britain who issues the Act of Grace in an attempt to suppress piracy.
- Simone Kessell as Mother Teach (season 1), Blackbeard's mother.
- Damien Gerard as Father Teach (season 1), Blackbeard's father.
- Selenis Leyva as "Nana" (season 1), a nun from St. Augustine who was Jim's guardian and mentor.
- Will Arnett as Calico Jack (season 1), a recently deposed pirate captain and former friend of Blackbeard who served with him under Captain Hornigold.
- Kristen Johnston as Evelyn Higgins (season 1), Mary's friend who attends a community gathering for widows.
- Tim Heidecker as Doug (season 1), Mary's painting instructor and lover.
- Mark Mitchinson as Benjamin "Ben" Hornigold (season 2), a pirate captain whom Blackbeard previously served under. He appears to Blackbeard during a dream sequence.
- Maaka Pohatu as John Bartholomew (season 2), a pirate captain whose ship is captured by Zheng Yi Sao.
- Rachel House as Mary Read (season 2), a former pirate and an old acquaintance of Blackbeard who has a love-hate relationship with Anne.
- Minnie Driver as Anne "Annie" Bonny (season 2), a former pirate and an old acquaintance of Blackbeard who collects antiques with Mary.
- Bronson Pinchot as Ned Low (season 2), a pirate captain and musician whose record for most raids at sea is broken by Blackbeard.
- Josie Whittlesey as Hellkat Maggie (season 2), the torturer for Ned's crew.

== Episodes ==
Season	Episodes	Originally released		
Season	Episodes	First released	Last released	Network
1	10	March 3, 2022	March 24, 2022	HBO Max
2	8	October 5, 2023	October 26, 2023	Max

=== Season 1 (2022) ===
No. overall	No. in season	Title	Directed by	Written by	Original release date
1	1	"Pilot"	Taika Waititi	David Jenkins	March 3, 2022
Stede Bonnet, a wealthy Barbadian landowner, abandons his wife, Mary, and their two children for life as a pirate captain. He commissions the building of a ship, the Revenge, and hires a crew. At sea sometime later, he learns that the crew, bored and irritated by his gentle manner and lack of pirating experience, have decided to mutiny and kill him. Stede chooses the nearest large ship for them to pillage, but the vessel turns out to be a Royal Navy warship captained by Stede's childhood bully, Nigel Badminton. Stede invites Nigel and his officers aboard, pretending that he and his crew are aristocrats. Nigel mocks Stede, and the naval officers threaten Stede's crew. Stede strikes Nigel on the head and, as Nigel falls, he stabs himself through the eye with his sword. The pirates take two officers hostage, escaping before Badminton's crew realizes what has happened. The crew, impressed by how Stede appears to have dealt with Nigel, decide to postpone the mutiny.
2	2	"A Damned Man"	Nacho Vigalondo	David Jenkins	March 3, 2022
After the ship accidentally runs aground on an island, Stede orders his crew to take a "vacation" and they disperse. The hostages escape, and Stede, Black Pete, and Oluwande set off to retrieve them, but are captured by the inhabitants of the island and put on trial. Stede, haunted by visions of Nigel, breaks down and confesses to murder; a tribal elder advises him that his guilt may stem from something deeper. The men are freed, but learn that their hostages have been sold to other pirates. Stede improvises a plan to catch these pirates off guard and, after a brief skirmish, agrees to a compromise, taking only one of the hostages back. As the crew sets sail, he appears to have made his peace with Badminton's death. Meanwhile, Lucius has discovered that crewmate Jim is in disguise; Jim knocks him unconscious and hides him belowdecks. The rival pirates secretly follow the Revenge under orders from their captain, now revealed as Blackbeard.
3	3	"A Gentleman Pirate"	Nacho Vigalondo	Adam Stein	March 3, 2022
Stede learns of the "Republic of Pirates", where he hopes to both sell off his remaining hostage and introduce himself as the newly minted "Gentleman Pirate". Aboard his ship, Blackbeard orders his first mate, Izzy Hands, to approach Stede and request a meeting. At the Republic, Stede enters a tavern owned by Spanish Jackie, who has set a price on Jim's head for killing Jackie's favorite husband. Izzy finds Stede and relays the request but does not mention Blackbeard by name, and Stede rudely dismisses him. A fight then breaks out over the purchase of the captive, and Jackie banishes Stede from the tavern. Geraldo, the bartender and one of Jackie's husbands, tricks Stede into boarding a Spanish navy ship, where he is stabbed and sentenced to death for piracy, and where Jim's disguise is exposed. Stede is about to be hanged when the ship is attacked by another pirate crew. Cut down before he strangles to death, Stede opens his eyes to see Blackbeard standing over him.
4	4	"Discomfort in a Married State"	Nacho Vigalondo	Eliza Jiménez Cossio	March 10, 2022
Blackbeard takes command of the Revenge while Stede recovers from his wounds. Flashbacks reveal Stede's unhappiness in his arranged marriage, culminating in his running off to become a pirate. When he wakes, Blackbeard greets him with his real name, Ed, and confesses that he's grown tired of his life, because no one dares to challenge him. He and Stede decide to switch lives for the day. This proves to be the last straw for Izzy, who angrily calls Blackbeard a "shell" of what he once was. Jim tells the crew that they wish to remain "Jim" and that they should be perceived the same as they were before. With Spanish warships closing in, Blackbeard's plan to use the cover of fog to escape is set back by a confusion over dates; since the ship is still too damaged to move on its own, Blackbeard had counted on the full moon's strong tides to carry them to safety. He and Stede come up with a new plan, to use a mirror and lanterns to pretend to be a lighthouse, and they fool the Spanish long enough to escape. Blackbeard convinces Stede to teach him how to be an aristocrat, and tells Izzy that he is planning to betray Stede and steal his identity.
5	5	"The Best Revenge Is Dressing Well"	Fernando Frías	John Mahone	March 10, 2022
Ed (Blackbeard) trains Stede's crew to become better pirates, while Stede teaches Ed about high society. In a flashback, a young Ed holds a silk scarf, and his mother tells him that they are not the kind of people to wear fine things. Ed proposes that they crash a high-society party hosted by French aristocrats. Ed is initially successful at mingling with the aristocrats but is later ridiculed after misusing utensils. Ed storms out of the dinner, but Stede defends him by proposing that the party guests play a game, during which Stede reveals all of the guests' secrets, turning the party into a brawl. Meanwhile, Oluwande and Frenchie pose as a crown prince of Egypt and his viceroy and scam the guests, inventing the world's first pyramid scheme. A fire breaks out and the pirates return to their ship. Frenchie and Oluwande share their earnings from the scam with the aristocrats' African servants. Later, aboard the Revenge, Stede tells Ed that he wears fine things well. Meanwhile, Admiral Chauncey Badminton, Nigel's twin brother, convinces King George to lend him the full force of the Royal Navy to avenge his brother's murder.
6	6	"The Art of Fuckery"	Fernando Frías	Simone Nathan	March 10, 2022
Ed helps Stede practice dueling, and forces Stede to stab him. Later, Blackbeard tells the crew the story of when he witnessed the Kraken kill his father. He demonstrates the "theatre of fear" by which Blackbeard frightens other ships, which he calls the "art of fuckery". Meanwhile, Izzy persuades Ed to murder Stede as soon as possible. Lucius develops an infection in his finger, and the crew tries unsuccessfully to amputate it. Later, the Revenge approaches a vessel, and Stede decides to try his hand at arranging a "fuckery". During the chaos, Blackbeard moves to kill Stede but is interrupted by a feverish Lucius, adding to the fuckery by amputating his infected finger himself. Stede then announces that the Kraken is approaching, triggering a traumatic flashback for Blackbeard. The sight of Blackbeard causes the invaders to retreat. When Stede goes to comfort him, Ed admits that the Kraken did not kill his father, he did. He also confesses to his original plan to kill Stede and take his identity. They agree to put the murder scheme behind them. That night, Izzy challenges Stede to a duel; the loser will be banished from the ship. Izzy stabs Stede, who, thanks to a trick taught by Blackbeard, directs the blow away from his vital organs, breaking Izzy's sword in the process. Stede is the winner, leading to Izzy's banishment. Black Pete whittles a new wooden finger for Lucius, and Lucius thanks him with a kiss. Izzy makes his way to Spanish Jackie's and makes a proposal.
7	7	"This Is Happening"	Fernando Frías	Zayre Ferrer	March 17, 2022
Ed mentions leaving the ship and Stede, seeking a way to keep him diverted, finds an opportunity when the crew goes to St. Augustine to buy oranges to treat the Swede's scurvy. Jim is reluctant to go ashore but refuses to explain why. Stede, Ed, and Lucius go on a treasure hunt, while the other pirates, including Jim, search for oranges. They find an orange tree in a church courtyard and meet a nun who Jim addresses as "Nana". Oluwande learns that Jim came to live with Nana after their father was murdered and that Nana taught Jim to use knives, to avenge the death of the Jimenez family at the hands of Siete Gallos, a roving band of mercenaries. Jim tells Nana that they have killed one of the seven. On the treasure hunt, Lucius confronts a surly Ed, calling him on the fact that Stede and Ed like each other, and asking him to have fun for Stede's sake. The treasure hunt culminates in the unearthing of a petrified orange under the Jimenez family tree. Stede keeps the treasure and the crew return to the ship, but without Jim, who remains behind to complete their revenge. Meanwhile, Chauncey Badminton arrives at Spanish Jackie's, where she and Izzy are plotting against Stede.
8	8	"We Gull Way Back"	Bert & Bertie	Alyssa Lane & Alex Sherman	March 17, 2022
An old friend of Blackbeard's, Calico Jack, arrives, rousing Blackbeard's more chaotic side, to Stede's displeasure. Jack explains that his crew mutinied; to cheer him up, the crew agree to visit Blind Man's Cove. Once there, he stirs up Stede's jealousy by mentioning he and Edward were past lovers. Heartbroken by Jim's absence, Oluwande gives up his cabin to Frenchie and Wee John, who express their excitement for their newfound status as roommates by redecorating the room. Meanwhile, Jim takes Geraldo hostage to force Spanish Jackie into telling them everything she knows about the Siete Gallos. Jackie kills Geraldo herself and reveals that Geraldo was a member of Siete Gallos, adding that all the others are likely dead. Back on the ship, a drunken Jack, playing with a whip, kills Buttons' pet seagull, Karl. Buttons curses Jack and Stede orders Jack off the ship. Blackbeard decides to join him. Jack admits to Blackbeard that Izzy sent him to get Blackbeard out of the way, and led the Revenge to be ambushed by Chauncey Badminton. Upon learning that Stede is in danger, Blackbeard races back to the Revenge and orders the crew to raise the white flag. The Royal Navy capture them, but Stede and Blackbeard are happy to be reunited. Buttons' hex takes effect when Calico Jack is hit by a stray British cannonball.
9	9	"Act of Grace"	Bert & Bertie	David Jenkins & Yvonne Zima	March 24, 2022
On the Revenge, Stede admits to having killed Nigel and is sentenced to death. Just as Stede is about to be executed, Blackbeard claims the Act of Grace, saving Stede, to Chauncey's anger. Blackbeard and Stede are sent to the Royal Privateering Academy, where Stede learns that he has been declared dead, and Blackbeard has to shave off his beard. Stede tries to convince him to escape, but Ed seems content to accept their fate. They realize that as long as they are together, they are happy, and they kiss. When they agree to assume new identities and run away to China together, Ed devises a plan for their escape. Yet before Stede can meet Ed, Chauncey takes him at gunpoint in the middle of the night into the forest. He accuses Stede of being a monster that ruins everyone's lives, including Blackbeard's, voicing all the doubts that Stede carries with him, but before he can kill Stede, Chauncey trips and kills himself in a similar manner to his brother. Having waited on a pier for hours, a heartbroken Ed returns to the Revenge and resumes his role as captain. Stede, meantime, has returned to his wife and children.
10	10	"Wherever You Go, There You Are"	Andrew DeYoung	David Jenkins	March 24, 2022
Stede comes home to find that a "widowed" Mary has built a new life for herself. Both struggle to return to their former patterns. After Mary attempts to kill Stede in his sleep, they discuss their feelings and become friends. Stede realizes he is in love with Ed and, with the help of Mary and her lover Doug, plans to fake his death and return to sea. Meanwhile, on the Revenge, a depressed Ed neglects his role as captain, causing Izzy to confront him about his perceived softness. That night, after reflecting on his life and relationship with Stede, Ed re-adopts the Kraken persona. He throws Lucius overboard, paints himself a new black beard and punishes Izzy's insubordination. He orders all of Stede's belongings to be thrown overboard and strands Stede's crew on a deserted island, with the exception of Frenchie and Jim. Alone in Stede's former quarters, Edward breaks down and cries. Stede takes a dinghy and leaves in search of Edward. He finds his starving crew and, standing on his dinghy, lighthouse-like, waves at an incredulous Oluwande.

=== Season 2 (2023) ===
No. overall	No. in season	Title	Directed by	Written by	Original release date
11	1	"Impossible Birds"	David Jenkins	David Jenkins & Alyssa Lane & Alex Sherman	October 5, 2023
Stede and his crew have taken up residence on the Republic of Pirates and are working at Spanish Jackie's to save up money for a ship. Meanwhile, the crew of the Revenge have been raiding ships regularly due to Blackbeard's increasingly erratic demands. Izzy makes an attempt to settle things between Blackbeard and the crew, but to no avail. Blackbeard holds the crew at gunpoint to confirm their satisfaction with their work environment, displaying strong suicidal ideation as he does so. When Izzy states that Blackbeard is distraught because of his feelings for Stede, Ed shoots him in the leg and names Frenchie his new first mate. Meanwhile, Stede learns from Richard Banes, a minor noble turned pirate, about a Roman puzzle chest in Jackie's possession and decides to steal it, but he and the crew are caught by Jackie before they can escape. A local soup vendor named Susan suddenly arrives and buys both the chest and the crew from Jackie. Susan is then revealed to be Zheng Yi Sao, Pirate Queen and conqueror of China.
12	2	"Red Flags"	David Jenkins	Adam Stein	October 5, 2023
Stede and his crew adjust to life aboard Zheng Yi Sao's ship the Red Flag while Ed continues to spiral. Lucius is revealed to be alive on the Red Flag and is joyfully reunited with the crew, resuming his relationship with Black Pete. Zheng pursues her feelings for Oluwande, much to Auntie's disapproval. On the Revenge, Jim and Archie have hidden Izzy in a stowaway compartment and amputate his wounded leg. Upon discovering him, Blackbeard goads Izzy into shooting him with a pistol but Izzy refuses. Blackbeard leaves the gun with Izzy and then goes up on deck to steer the ship into an oncoming storm. Jim, Frenchie, and the others realize this too late. As Blackbeard threatens to shoot a cannonball into the mast, Izzy appears and shoots Blackbeard to stop him. The crew gather round Blackbeard's prone form as Jim raises a cannonball over their head, seemingly with intent to kill.
13	3	"The Innkeeper"	Andrew DeYoung	Alyssa Lane & Alex Sherman	October 5, 2023
Zheng Yi Sao's crew complete a successful raid, then come upon the damaged Revenge. Stede jumps in the water to swim to Ed, and finds the remaining crew, but can't get any information about Ed's whereabouts. Ed, meanwhile, wakes up on a deserted beach before being rescued and cared for by his former captain, Benjamin Hornigold. Auntie suspects a mutiny and advises Zheng to kill the crew of the Revenge, which Zheng agrees to after Ed's body is discovered. Stede and the crew escape and steal back the Revenge, taking the Red Flag's wheel in the process. After a physical fight with Hornigold, Ed realizes that he is in a form of purgatory referred to as the Gravy Basket, and must decide whether to live or die. Ed is tied to a rock and pushed into the water, and he begins to drown. He is saved by the sound of Stede's voice and his appearance in the form of a mermaid, swimming towards Ed. Ed wakes up to Stede by his bedside, clutching his hand.
14	4	"Fun and Games"	Andrew DeYoung	David Jenkins and Eliza Jiménez Cossio	October 12, 2023
Stede assists Buttons in his quest to transmogrify into a bird and the pair find themselves on the same island that Ed had washed ashore upon after being banished from the Revenge. Here Ed encounters old friends and fellow pirates Anne Bonny and Mary Read, now running an antiques emporium. Witnessing their dysfunctional relationship during dinner helps Ed to repair his relationship with Stede. Meanwhile, the crew of the Revenge descend into factional infighting but ultimately come together to create a prosthetic leg for Izzy from the ship's figurehead. Stede has Ed's banishment paused for a night.
15	5	"The Curse of the Seafaring Life"	Andrew DeYoung	John Mahone and Simone Nathan	October 12, 2023
Ed is allowed back on the Revenge on probation, and works through some of his past with Lucius and Fang. Stede seeks to improve his pirating skills with Izzy's help, as part of which the pirates raid a ship whose crew have already been murdered. Returning with only one significant item of treasure: a new suit for Stede, the crew are convinced the suit is cursed, and Stede is ultimately forced to part with it. Ed receives a few lessons in fishing and life from Fang, whose real name turns out to be Kevin Junior. Lucius proposes to Black Pete. At the end of the day, Ed and Stede share a heart to heart on deck in the moonlight.
16	6	"Calypso's Birthday"	Fernando Frías	Zayre Ferrer	October 19, 2023
The crew's party, financed by the proceeds of Blackbeard's treasure, in celebration of Calypso's Birthday is interrupted by rival pirate Ned Low and his crew, who is unhappy his record breaking streak of raids has been beaten by Blackbeard. Lucius and Black Pete go undetected below decks and plan a counter attack, but before they can enact this, Low's torturing of the crew of the Revenge comes to a premature end when Stede causes dissent among the rival's crew. Now with the upper hand, Stede retaliates by forcing Low to walk the plank, his first deliberate taking of another life as a pirate. The crew resume the party, while Stede heads to his cabin alone. Ed goes to check on him and the two kiss passionately before consummating their relationship. Richard Banes, AKA Prince Ricky is plotting revenge on the pirates, when he receives an invitation from Zheng Yi Sao.
17	7	"Man on Fire"	Fernando Frías	James Tom (Note: credited as Jes Tom) and Natalie Torres	October 19, 2023
Ed discards his old life starting with his leathers. The Revenge docks at the Republic of Pirates, where the crew bump into Zheng Yi Sao and Auntie. They make their way to Spanish Jackie's despite the danger of losing their heads, but are welcomed due to their new found infamy. Stede revelling in his new-found fame gets a piercing and performs his first immolation, while Ed ruminates and decides to become a fisherman. Jim arranges for Oluwande to reconcile with Zheng Yi Sao, but Stede starts a mass brawl and is only saved from Zheng when she is double-crossed by Prince Richard and her entire fleet explodes at the striking of the midnight hour.
18	8	"Mermen"	Fernando Frías	David Jenkins & John Mahone	October 26, 2023
Ed struggles to make fishing a successful career move. He returns to find the Republic of Pirates now under the control of Prince Richard and the Royal Navy. Retrieving his leathers, he finds one of Stede's 'message in a bottle' love letters and the pair are soon reunited. Joining forces with Zheng Yi Sao they return to Spanish Jackie's, only to find she has poisoned the Royal Navy officers in her bar. Disguised in the dead officers' uniforms, the pirates infiltrate the garrison, killing many of the soldiers before escaping to the sea. Izzy, mortally wounded, reconciles with Ed before drawing his last breath. Lucius and Black Pete are married and Ed and Stede retire to a life of innkeeping.

== Production ==
=== Development ===
Creator and showrunner David Jenkins was inspired to write the show after learning about Stede Bonnet from his wife and subsequently reading his Wikipedia article. He was particularly interested in filling in the blanks of Bonnet's life, trying to find his motivations for abandoning his family as well as understanding why Blackbeard took him under his wing. From the outset he envisioned the show as centering on a romantic relationship between Bonnet and Blackbeard, and pitched it as such.

Taika Waititi, who shares a manager with Jenkins, became involved after Jenkins told him the story of Stede Bonnet and asked if he wanted to be involved. Waititi was attracted to the project because of what he believed to be Jenkins' original approach to pirates. In subsequent discussions, they agreed that a romance between Bonnet and Teach was "the reason to do the show". Garrett Basch later joined the project as executive producer after reading the script for the pilot episode.

The show was given a straight to series order by HBO Max in September 2020 with Jenkins, Basch and Halstead as executive producers, and Waititi as both an executive producer and director of the first episode. On June 1, 2022, the series was renewed for a second season. The second season's budget was reduced by 40% due to companywide cutbacks at Warner Bros. Discovery.

=== Casting ===
Casting an actor to play Stede Bonnet began shortly after the series was ordered. While Rhys Darby's name was mentioned early in the process, it was not until after an unsuccessful round of auditions and most of the script had been written that he was again brought into consideration. His casting was officially announced in January 2021. Jenkins stated that Darby made an otherwise unlikable Stede Bonnet likeable, telling SlashFilm that he was "the only person who could play it". Darby, whose career has consisted primarily of supporting comedic roles, saw the role as an opportunity to branch out and play a leading, and more dramatic role, telling Deadline "I looked at myself and how much experience I've had over the years and I felt maybe it is time to step up."

Taika Waititi, who was already attached as executive producer and director, joined the cast to play Blackbeard four months later in April 2021. Jenkins had begun writing the role with Waititi in mind, and eventually approached him over text asking if he would be interested in playing Blackbeard. In the official casting announcement Jenkins said of Waititi "Our Blackbeard is a legend, a lover, a fighter, a tactical genius, a poetic soul and quite possibly insane. Only one man could play this role, and that is the great Taika Waititi. We're thrilled beyond measure he's decided to don the beard."

In June, it was announced that Kristian Nairn, Nathan Foad, Samson Kayo, Rory Kinnear, Con O'Neill and Vico Ortiz had been added to the cast, with the additions of Ewen Bremner, David Fane, Joel Fry, Guz Khan and Matthew Maher announced in July. In August, it was announced that Leslie Jones, Nat Faxon, Fred Armisen and Samba Schutte were cast in recurring roles.

=== Filming ===
Filming took place between June 14 and September 28, 2021. Taika Waititi, who serves as an executive producer, also directed the pilot episode, which was filmed after Waititi completed production on Thor: Love and Thunder. The scenes aboard the Revenge were filmed on a soundstage using StageCraft.

The second season began filming on September 25, 2022, in New Zealand. The New Zealand Film Commission and Tourism New Zealand partnered with Max for a tourism campaign that highlighted the economic and cultural benefits the production brought to New Zealand. Filming wrapped on December 13, 2022.

=== Music ===
The original score for the series was composed by Mark Mothersbaugh. On May 5, 2022, it was announced that the soundtrack album for the first season would be released by WaterTower Music on May 6, 2022. The soundtrack for the second season released on October 26, 2023.

=== Cancellation ===
On January 9, 2024, series creator David Jenkins announced that Max had canceled the series after two seasons. Jenkins stated he had originally planned for three seasons and referred to the cancellation as a "premature end". According to some reports, the third season was set to begin pre-production in New Zealand before news of the "seemingly sudden" cancellation broke. Jason Mantzoukas revealed he was actively pursuing a role in the third season prior to the cancellation.

The high-profile cancellation of Our Flag Means Death, along with a general decline in the production of scripted content across the streaming industry, marked the end of the Peak TV era. The cancellation was attributed to the "Cancel Your Gays" trend and quickly became one of the most controversial cancellations in television history. Fans responded on social media with many believing the decision to cancel the series was due to homophobia. Critics were surprised by the cancellation given the show's success and voiced their disappointment with the decision. Daniel Fienberg of The Hollywood Reporter stated "I am really still confused by [the cancellation of] Our Flag Means Death, because that is a show that for a long time was in the Top 10 on Max."

A fan-funded campaign dubbed "Renew as a Crew" was launched and raised enough funds to rent both a billboard in Times Square and a plane flying over Hollywood with the message "Save Our Flag Means Death". Fan efforts also included a Change.org petition which gained over 85,000 signatures as of March 2024. A campaign to boycott Max and move the series to a different streamer continued under the banner of "Adopt Our Crew". Despite a vigorous fan campaign, on March 7, 2024, Jenkins announced that the show was unable to find a new home and thanked fans for their support. Jenkins explained that this outcome "had more to do with an industry trying to figure out how to transition to a new era (and in some instances keep the lights on)."

After the cancellation, cast member Samba Schutte appeared on the podcast You Made it Weird with Pete Holmes and revealed that the third season of the series "didn't get picked up by Max because … no money, they don't have money." An official Our Flag Means Death podcast was in development at Max with Schutte set to host, but was also canceled due to Warner Bros. Discovery's financial struggles.

On the Talking Strange podcast with Aaron Sagers, series star Rhys Darby expressed his disappointment with the cancellation and confirmed there was "a financial element" involved in the decision. Darby has been outspoken about the series' "unexpected cancellation", calling it "illogical" and "a bit of a shock because we knew it was very successful. The numbers were big and globally it was a big hit. We had already sold the first season or two to the BBC and we knew we had a massive fandom. Creator David Jenkins said publicly he only wanted to do three seasons, but they pulled the rug from underneath us." Darby continued "it's been ... really tough since the finish of the show because it was taken away at a moment where it was at its most popular." He further explained "I think I'm still in shock that it's over. Even though [it's] been two years now, I keep it out of my head because when I start to think about it, I'm like, "Why did that get canceled?!" It just makes no sense."

In September 2024, Jenkins expressed interest in Netflix acquiring the series. This reignited the fan renewal campaign with a new mission of moving the series to Netflix. Jenkins has since stated he will never rule out the show's return and remains open to selling it.

== Release ==
Our Flag Means Death's first season premiered on HBO Max on March 3, 2022, and released 2–3 weekly episodes through March 24, 2022. The season finale, which consisted of episodes 9 and 10, received an advance screening for members of the Television Academy on March 22, 2022.

In August 2023, a Vanity Fair first look exclusive revealed the second season would premiere on Max in October 2023. The second season premiered with 3 episodes on October 5, 2023, followed by the release of 2 weekly episodes through October 19, 2023. The season finale was released as a single episode that aired on October 26, 2023. Episodes 6 and 7 of the second season were given an advance screening at the NewFest Film Festival on October 16, 2023. The world premiere featured a live panel hosted by Max.

The BBC acquired the series in December 2022 and announced plans to air it in the United Kingdom in early 2023. Our Flag Means Death aired on BBC Two on January 4, 2023, at 10 pm, with one episode airing each week. After the first episode aired, every episode became available to watch or download via the BBC's iPlayer. The second season began airing on February 5, 2024, again on BBC Two in a 10 pm weekday timeslot. Once again, all episodes from the second season became available immediately afterwards on its iPlayer streaming service.

== Reception ==
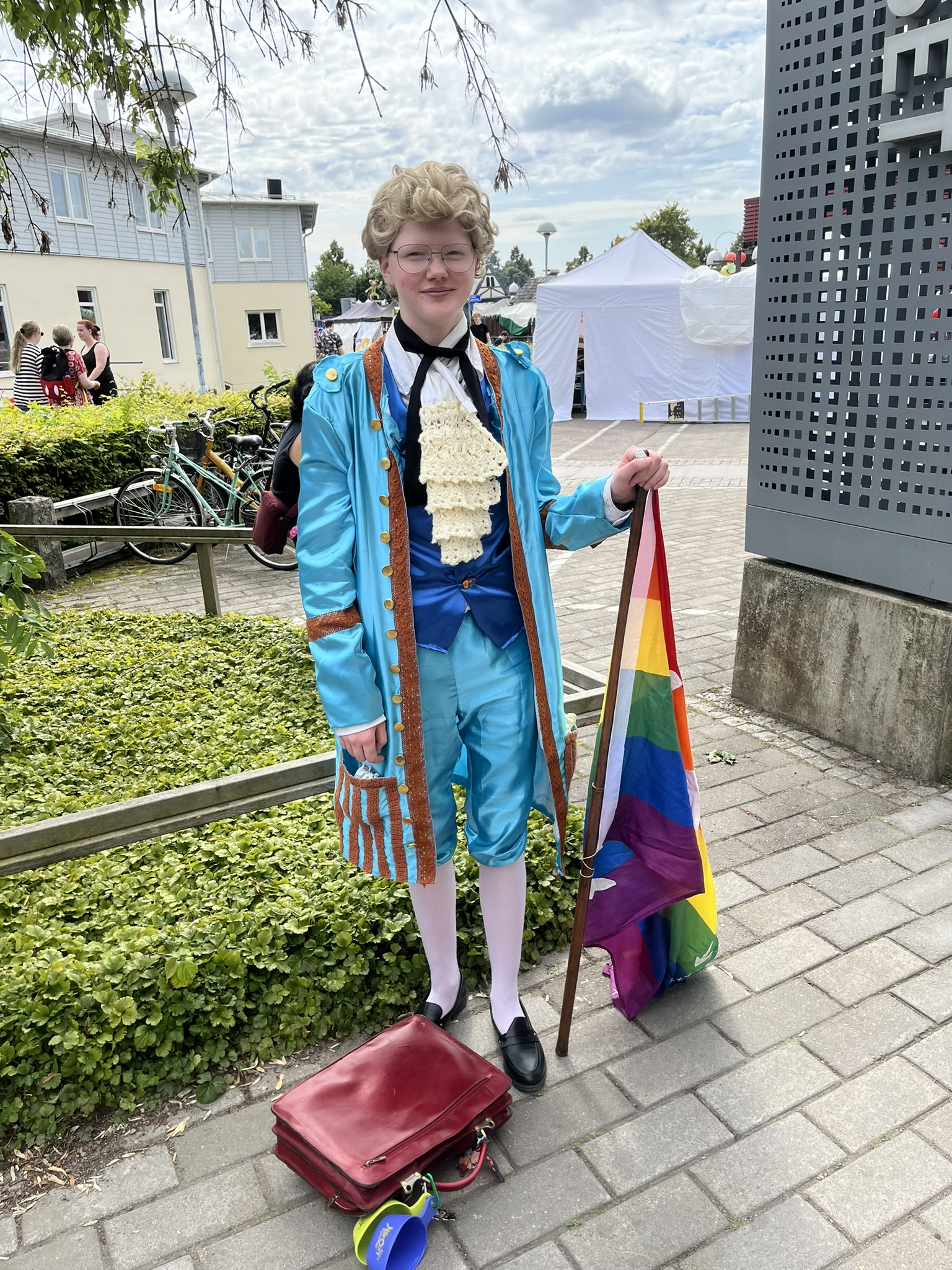
A cosplay portrayal of Stede Bonnet as he appears in Our Flag Means Death

=== Critics' top 10 and best-of lists ===
2022
- No. 1 Them
- No. 1 The Script Lab
- No. 5 CBC Arts
- No. 6 Harper's Bazar
- No. 6 Los Angeles Times
- No. 6 Nerdist
- No. 7 Inverse
- No. 7 The Ringer
- No. 8 Ars Technica
- No. 8 E! Online
- No. 8 GameSpot
- No. 8 IO9
- No. 8 Las Vegas Weekly
- No. 8 Paste
- No. 8 Washington Post
- No. 9 The Atlantic
- No. 9 CBR
- No. 9 ShortList
- No. 9 Town & Country
- No. 10 Decider
- No. 10 Forbes
- No. 10 Lifehacker
- No. 10 Mashable
- No. 10 TV Insider
- No. 11 BuzzFeed
- No. 11 SlashFilm
- No. 11 Glamour
- No. 14 Moviejawn
- No. 16 Tom's Guide
- No. 18 USA Today
- No. 19 Entertainment Weekly
- No. 20 Collider
- No. 21 Metacritic
- No. 25 Tell-Tale TV
- No. 26 The Playlist
- No. 27 The A.V. Club
- No. 30 Bored Panda
- No. 73 Rotten Tomatoes
- No. 80 TV Guide
- – CBR
- – IMDb
- – Book and Film Globe
- – IndieWire
- – Looper
- – Polygon
- – The Hollywood Reporter
- – WeedMaps

2023
- No. 3 425 Magazine
- No. 3 The Nerd Stash
- No. 4 CultureVulture
- No. 4 Out
- No. 4 Virgin Media
- No. 4 Vulture
- No. 5 Digital Trends
- No. 6 Broadsheet
- No. 8 DeadAnt
- No. 8 Decider
- No. 8 Screen Rant
- No. 9 But Why Tho?
- No. 9 Tell-Tale TV
- No. 9 The Playlist
- No. 10 Gay Times
- No. 10 Vanity Fair
- No. 11 Cosmopolitan
- No. 12 TV Insider
- No. 13 Entertainment Weekly
- No. 13 Primetimer
- No. 14 Gizmodo
- No. 15 RogerEbert.com
- No. 16 The Spool
- No. 20 Paste
- No. 23 Them
- No. 24 Mashable
- No. 25 Town & Country
- No. 37 Rotten Tomatoes
- No. 40 Los Angeles Times
- – Bay Area Reporter
- – Collider
- – Concrete Playground
- – CableTV.com
- – Den of Geek
- – Gay Community News
- – Loud and Clear
- – PinkNews
- – ScreenHub
- – TechRadar
- – Time
- – Uproxx

2024
- No. 3 TV Insider
- No. 5 Mental Floss
- No. 6 GamesRadar+
- No. 6 Screen Rant
- No. 7 Paste
- No. 8 CBR
- No. 31 Entertainment Weekly
- – CNET
- – Greater Good Science Center
- – Lifehacker
- – Swooon
- – Vulture
- – Wired

2025
- No. 1 Collider
- No. 2 FandomeWire
- No. 4 Collider
- No. 4 Tell-Tale TV
- No. 5 SlashFilm
- No. 11 Buzzfeed
- No. 15 CBR
- No. 24 Out
- – Analytics Insight
- – Lifehacker
- – The Manual

=== Critical response ===
==== Season 1 ====
Rotten Tomatoes reported an approval rating of 94% based on 48 critic reviews. The website's critical consensus reads, "Our Flag Means Death's gentle sensibility doesn't quite strike comedic gold, but its bemusing band of buccaneers are endearing enough that viewers seeking a comforting watch will find bountiful booty." Metacritic gave the first season a weighted average score of 70 out of 100 based on 15 critic reviews, indicating "generally favorable reviews". The series was named one of the best shows of 2022 based on Metacritic's year-end compilation of television critics' top 10 lists.

In a review for IndieWire, Ben Travers referred to the series as "pure joy" and "a sweet, splendid farce", with Darby and Waititi portraying characters "perfectly suited to their strengths". Caroline Framke's Variety review praised the story's "surprising introspection" along with Darby and Waititi's "charged chemistry". Angie Han of The Hollywood Reporter compared the series to Ted Lasso, calling it an "endearing comedy" with "a surprising amount of heart". Angela Tricarico of Business Insider dubbed the series "one of HBO Max's best", describing it as "an exciting and surprising comedy that makes an excellent case for subscribing". Writing for Forbes, Paul Tassi described the series' central love story as "one of the most compelling gay romances I've seen really in any TV show, a funny, sad, heartwrenching romance." Glen Weldon expressed his love for the series in his review for NPR's Pop Culture Happy Hour, stating "I love the show. I want to marry the show. I want to live inside the show."

The series was praised for its substantial LGBTQ+ representation, which consists of three queer relationships, one of which involves a nonbinary character (Jim Jimenez). The central romance of the show, between Bonnet and Teach, was originally believed by many to be a "friendship". Critics praised the series for subverting the common queerbaiting trope by making Bonnet and Teach's relationship explicit before the end of the season.

Critics also commended the series for its depiction of BIPOC characters. According to Jenkins, he and his diverse writing team aimed to center the experiences of BIPOC without subjecting them to "trauma porn", stating "we wanted a show where these characters can just exist and their race ... doesn't automatically lead to a traumatic storyline for them".

==== Season 2 ====
The second season received a Rotten Tomatoes approval rating of 96% based on 38 critic reviews, with an average rating of 8.2/10. The critics consensus reads, "Our Flag Means Death's sophomore season doubles down on the fans' favorite ship to some diminishing returns, but it still delivers enough joyous moments to get viewers' sabers rattling". The season ranked among Rotten Tomatoes' best series of 2023 and was named one of the top 10 comedies of the year in the Golden Tomato Awards. Metacritic gave the season a weighted average score of 75 out of 100 based on 16 critic reviews.

TV Guide hailed the second season as "a triumph", calling it "sentimental yet satirical, with thoughtful hidden depths: a rare and welcome combination." Yahoo! News echoed this sentiment, describing the show's "triumphant return" as "funnier, juicier and more romantic than its first season." The Daily Beast declared the second season to be "even better" than the first, writing "Things change, but Our Flag Means Death's position as one of the best shows on television has not." RogerEbert.com described the "irreverent and charming" sophomore outing as more "confident", writing "the second season of Our Flag Means Death delivers another dose of the offbeat humor that made the first season such a breakout hit while doubling down on the romance that made fans fall in love with it." Paste awarded the season a 9.7/10 based on its "emotional, romantic, and comedic depth". The Playlist gave it an A−, noting "it's a funnier season than the first, with some great guest appearances and an intelligent level of growth in the ensemble". In their review of the season finale, TV Insider awarded Our Flag Means Death the title of "TV's Best Feel-Good Comedy of 2023".

While critics deemed the second season funnier and more romantic than the first, they also described it as darker. Collider gave the "distinctly darker" season an A−, praising its ability to "balance between lighter and darker elements, which all contribute to a perfect tenor that sings throughout every episode." SlashFilm applauded the season's "comedy, emotional core, and thrilling sense of peril," adding "even in its darkest moments, the show's writing is brilliantly snappy and deeply quirky." The Wall Street Journal commended the season's "fun" and "creatively delinquent" mix of romance and "casual carnage", comparing it to a hypothetical John Hughes and Quentin Tarantino collaboration. Mashable cautioned "fans who enjoyed the buoyancy of Season 1 might be thrown by the occasionally grim intensity of Season 2," but went on to say "amid heart-to-hearts about trauma and change, Jenkins and his crew make room for queer joy." IGN was slightly more critical of the darker tone, writing "too much angst almost capsizes the fun", but praised the series for being "a unicorn show" where "Darby and Waititi remain the charming fulcrums around which their very funny ensemble rotate."

=== Viewership ===
Our Flag Means Death debuted to popular acclaim and ranks among the top three most watched comedy series premieres in HBO Max history. Audience demand for the series more than tripled during the three weeks between the premiere and the finale, making Our Flag Means Death the most popular show on HBO Max, the biggest new series in the U.S., and the 11th most in-demand show in the world. The series unseated The Book of Boba Fett, which had previously dominated the charts for three months. It remained the most in-demand breakout series across all streaming platforms for seven consecutive weeks until it was dethroned by the premiere of Star Trek: Strange New Worlds. A week later, Our Flag Means Death regained the top spot. The series went on to become the 2nd most in-demand series among young adult viewers across all platforms.

The second season debuted to even higher demand, reaching the #1 spot on Max upon its release and spending a total of 6 weeks in the service's Top 10. It reached nearly 45 times the average series demand in its first 10 days, outperforming the third seasons of HBO staple series The Righteous Gemstones and Succession. It became the most popular LGBTQIA+ series in both the U.S. and U.K. after audience demand peaked at nearly 60 times the average demand for the second season finale. The Wall Street Journal reported the series "closed out its second season with a bigger fan following than it started with" and "ranks within the top 1% of all television series". In a November 2023 interview with TV Insider, series star Rhys Darby commented on the second season's viewership, stating "people [are] watching it, and it's rating really high."Our Flag Means Death became the most popular Max Original and the 3rd most popular series on Max in 2023, ranking behind The Last of Us and Succession. The success of the second season elevated the series to flagship status at Max, resulting in the launch of official merchandise sold through the HBO Shop.

=== Accolades ===
Awards and nominations received by Our Flag Means Death
Year	Award	Category	Nominee(s)	Result	Ref.
2022	Tell-Tale TV Awards	Favorite New Comedy Series	Our Flag Means Death	Won	
2022	Tell-Tale TV Awards	Favorite Ensemble in a Comedy Series	Our Flag Means Death	Won	
2022	Tell-Tale TV Awards	Favorite Performer in a Cable or Streaming Comedy Series	Rhys Darby	Won	
2022	Dorian TV Awards	Best TV Comedy	Our Flag Means Death	Nominated	
2022	Dorian TV Awards	Best LGBTQ TV Show	Our Flag Means Death	Nominated	
2022	Dorian TV Awards	Best Unsung TV Show	Our Flag Means Death	Nominated	
2022	Hollywood Critics Association Television Awards	Best Actor in a Streaming Series, Comedy	Rhys Darby	Nominated	
2022	Hollywood Critics Association Television Awards	Best Supporting Actor in a Streaming Series, Comedy	Taika Waititi	Nominated	
2022	Hollywood Critics Association Television Awards	Best Directing in a Streaming Series, Comedy	Taika Waititi (for "Pilot")	Nominated	
2022	Gold Derby TV Awards	Best Comedy Series	Our Flag Means Death	Nominated	
2022	Gold Derby TV Awards	Best Ensemble of the Year	Our Flag Means Death	Nominated	
2022	Gold Derby TV Awards	Best Comedy Actor	Rhys Darby	Nominated	
2022	Gold Derby TV Awards	Best Comedy Supporting Actor	Taika Waititi	Nominated	
2022	Gold Derby TV Awards	Best Comedy Supporting Actor	Vico Ortiz	Nominated	
2022	Gold Derby TV Awards	Best Comedy Guest Actress	Leslie Jones	Nominated	
2022	The Queerties	Favorite TV Performance	Vico Ortiz	Nominated	
2022	Golden Trailer Awards	Best Comedy Poster for a TV/Streaming Series	Our Flag Means Death, HBO Max	Nominated	
2022	Autostraddle TV Awards	Outstanding Cis Male Character	Taika Waititi	Runner-up	
2022	The ReFrame Stamp	IMDbPro Top 200 Narrative and Streaming TV (2021 - 2022)	Our Flag Means Death	Nominated	
2022	Clio Entertainment Awards	Television/Series: Public Relations	Our Flag Means Death, HBO Max, The Syndicate	Shortlisted	
2022	IMDb Best of 2022 Awards	Top 100 Series of 2022	Our Flag Means Death	Won	
2022	IMDb Best of 2022 Awards	Fan Favorite Cast	Our Flag Means Death	Won	
2022	Art Directors Guild Awards	Excellence in Production Design for a Half Hour Single-Camera Television Series	Ra Vincent (for "Pilot")	Won	
2022	GLAAD Media Awards	Outstanding New Series	Our Flag Means Death	Nominated	
2022	Make-Up Artists and Hair Stylists Guild Awards	Best Period and/or Character Hair Styling	Margarita Pidgeon, Stacy Bisel, Kate Loftis, Christopher Enlow	Won	
2022	Nebula Awards	Ray Bradbury Nebula Award for Outstanding Dramatic Presentation	Our Flag Means Death, David Jenkins, Eliza Jiménez Cossio, Zadry Ferrer-Geddes, William Meny, Maddie Dai, Alyssa Lane, John Mahone, Simone Nathan, Natalie Torres, Zackery Alexzander Stephens, Alex J. Sherman, James Tom, Adam Stein, Yvonne Zima	Nominated	
2022	Peabody Awards	Entertainment	Our Flag Means Death	Nominated	
2023
2023	Art Directors Guild Awards	Excellence in Production Design for a Half Hour Single-Camera Television Series	Ra Vincent (for "Impossible Birds", "Red Flags", "Man on Fire")	Nominated	
2023	GLAAD Media Awards	GLAAD Media Award for Outstanding Comedy Series	Our Flag Means Death	Nominated	
2023	Dorian TV Awards	Best Unsung TV Show	Our Flag Means Death	Nominated	
2023	The Queerties	Favorite TV Comedy	Our Flag Means Death	Runner-up	
2023	The Queerties	Favorite TV Performance	Vico Ortiz	Runner-up	
2023	Tell-Tale TV Awards	Favorite Cable or Streaming Comedy Series	Our Flag Means Death	Won	
2023	Tell-Tale TV Awards	Favorite Performer in a Cable or Streaming Comedy Series	Rhys Darby	Won	
2023	Tell-Tale TV Awards	Favorite Performer in a Cable or Streaming Comedy Series	Ruibo Qian	Nominated	
2023	Golden Tomato Awards	Top 10 Best Comedy Series of 2023	Our Flag Means Death	Won	
2024			Our Flag Means Death		
2024	Astra Awards	Best Actor in a Streaming Comedy Series	Rhys Darby	Nominated	
2024	Gold Derby TV Awards	Best Comedy Series	Our Flag Means Death	Nominated	
2024	Gold Derby TV Awards	Best Comedy Actor	Rhys Darby	Nominated	
2024	International Online Cinema Awards	Best Guest Actress in a Comedy Series	Minnie Driver	Nominated	
2024	Cannes Lions International Festival of Creativity	Social & Influencer	Our Flag Means Death, Max, Tourism New Zealand, Augusto	Nominated	
2024	Clio Entertainment Awards	Public Service: Branded Entertainment & Content	Our Flag Means Death, Max, Tourism New Zealand, Augusto	Won	
2024	The ReFrame Stamp	IMDbPro Top 200 Narrative and Streaming TV (2023 - 2024)	Our Flag Means Death	Nominated	
2024	Australian Production Design Guild Awards	Catherine Martin Costume Design for a Television Production	Gypsy Taylor	Won	
2024	Australian Production Design Guild Awards	Production Art Department and Design Awards Concept Art	Adam Wheatley	Nominated	
2024	Autostraddle TV Awards	Outstanding Sci-Fi/Fantasy/Horror Series	Our Flag Means Death	Nominated	
2024	Autostraddle TV Awards	Outstanding Supporting or Guest Actor Playing an LGBTQ+ Character in a Sci-Fi/Fantasy Series	Vico Ortiz	Nominated	
2024	Autostraddle TV Awards	Fan Favorite Out LGBTQ+ Actor	Vico Ortiz	Won	
2024	TV Choice Awards	Best Comedy Show	Our Flag Means Death	Nominated	
2024	Greater Good Science Center Goodie Awards	Transformational Love Award	Our Flag Means Death	Won	
2024	New Zealand Television Awards	Best Soundtrack	Our Flag Means Death, Pinnacle Post	Won	
2025
2025	Deutscher Synchronpreis	Series / Comedy	Our Flag Means Death	Nominated	
