= Saturn Award for Best Guest Starring Role on Television =

Television award

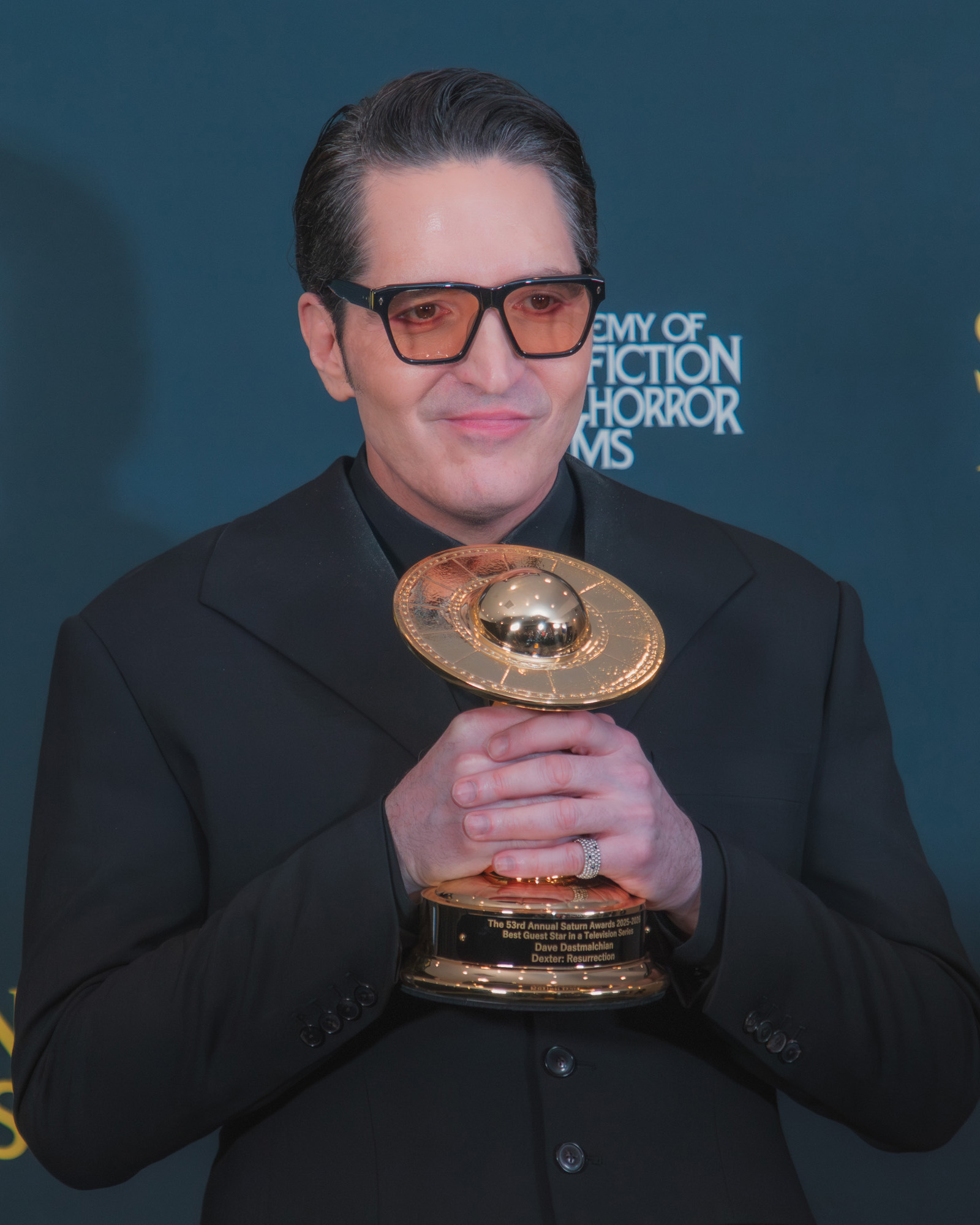
- The 2024/2025 recipient: David Dastmalchian
- Awarded for: Best performance of the year credited as a guest appearance by an actor (male or female) in a genre television series, for a single or several episodes
- Country: United States
- Presented by: Academy of Science Fiction, Fantasy and Horror Films
- First award: 2008
- Currently held by: David Dastmalchian for Dexter: Resurrection (2024/2025)
- Website: www.saturnawards.org

The following is a list of Saturn Award winners for Best Guest Starring Role on Television (or Best Guest Performance in a Television Series).

The award is presented annually by the Academy of Science Fiction, Fantasy and Horror Films, honoring the work of actors and actresses in science fiction, fantasy, and horror fiction on television. The category was split into two awards: Saturn Award for Best Guest-Starring Performance in a Streaming Television Series and Saturn Award for Best Guest Starring Performance in a Network or Cable Television Series at the 47th Saturn Awards.

(NOTE: Year refers to year of eligibility, the actual ceremonies are held the following year)

The winners are listed in bold.

== Winners and Nominees ==
=== 2000s ===
| Year | Actor / Actress | TV Series | Network | Character |
|---|---|---|---|---|
| 2008 **(35th)** | **Jimmy Smits** | **Dexter** | **Showtime** | **Miguel Prado** |
| 2008 **(35th)** | Kristen Bell | Heroes | NBC | Elle Bishop |
| 2008 **(35th)** | Alan Dale | Lost | ABC | Charles Widmore |
| 2008 **(35th)** | Kevin Durand | Lost | ABC | Martin Keamy |
| 2008 **(35th)** | Robert Forster | Heroes | NBC | Arthur Petrelli |
| 2008 **(35th)** | Sonya Walger | Lost | ABC | Penny Widmore |
| 2009 **(36th)** | **Leonard Nimoy** | **Fringe** | **Fox** | **Dr. William Bell** |
| 2009 **(36th)** | Bernard Cribbins | Doctor Who | BBC America | Wilfred Mott |
| 2009 **(36th)** | Raymond Cruz | Breaking Bad | AMC | Tuco Salamanca |
| 2009 **(36th)** | Michelle Forbes | True Blood | HBO | Maryann Forrester |
| 2009 **(36th)** | John Lithgow | Dexter | Showtime | Arthur Mitchell |
| 2009 **(36th)** | Mark Pellegrino | Lost | ABC | Jacob |

=== 2010s ===
| Year | Actor / Actress | TV Series | Network | Character |
|---|---|---|---|---|
| 2010 **(37th)** | **Richard Dreyfuss** | **Weeds** | **Showtime** | **Warren Schiff** |
| 2010 **(37th)** | **Joe Manganiello** | **True Blood** | **HBO** | **Alcide Herveaux** |
| 2010 **(37th)** | Noah Emmerich | The Walking Dead | AMC | Dr. Edwin Jenner |
| 2010 **(37th)** | Giancarlo Esposito | Breaking Bad | AMC | Gustavo "Gus" Fring |
| 2010 **(37th)** | Seth Gabel | Fringe | Fox | Lincoln Lee |
| 2010 **(37th)** | John Terry | Lost | ABC | Dr. Christian Shephard |
| 2011 **(38th)** | **Tom Skerritt** | **Leverage** | **TNT** | **Jimmy Ford** |
| 2011 **(38th)** | Steven Bauer | Breaking Bad | AMC | Don Eladio Vuente |
| 2011 **(38th)** | Orla Brady | Fringe | Fox | Elizabeth Bishop |
| 2011 **(38th)** | Mark Margolis | Breaking Bad | AMC | Héctor "Tio" Salamanca |
| 2011 **(38th)** | Edward James Olmos | Dexter | Showtime | Professor James Gellar |
| 2011 **(38th)** | Zachary Quinto | American Horror Story: Murder House | FX | Chad Warwick |
| 2012 **(39th)** | **Yvonne Strahovski** | **Dexter** | **Showtime** | **Hannah McKay** |
| 2012 **(39th)** | Blair Brown | Fringe | Fox | Nina Sharp |
| 2012 **(39th)** | Terry O'Quinn | Falling Skies | TNT | Arthur Manchester |
| 2012 **(39th)** | Lance Reddick | Fringe | Fox | Phillip Broyles |
| 2012 **(39th)** | Mark Sheppard | Leverage | TNT | Jim Sterling |
| 2012 **(39th)** | Ray Stevenson | Dexter | Showtime | Issak Sirko |
| 2013 **(40th)** | **Robert Forster** | **Breaking Bad** | **AMC** | **Ed** |
| 2013 **(40th)** | Stephen Collins | Falling Skies | TNT | President Hathaway |
| 2013 **(40th)** | Danny Huston | American Horror Story: Coven | FX | The Axeman |
| 2013 **(40th)** | David Morrissey | The Walking Dead | AMC | The Governor |
| 2013 **(40th)** | Charlotte Rampling | Dexter | Showtime | Dr. Evelyn Vogel |
| 2013 **(40th)** | Gina Torres | Hannibal | NBC | Phyllis "Bella" Crawford |
| 2014 **(41st)** | **Wentworth Miller** | **The Flash** | **The CW** | **Leonard Snart / Captain Cold** |
| 2014 **(41st)** | Dominic Cooper | Agent Carter | ABC | Howard Stark |
| 2014 **(41st)** | Neil Patrick Harris | American Horror Story: Freak Show | FX | Chester Creb |
| 2014 **(41st)** | John Larroquette | The Librarians | TNT | Jenkins / Galahad |
| 2014 **(41st)** | Michael Pitt | Hannibal | NBC | Mason Verger |
| 2014 **(41st)** | Andrew J. West | The Walking Dead | AMC | Gareth |
| 2015 **(42nd)** | **William Shatner** | **Haven** | **Syfy** | **Croatoan** |
| 2015 **(42nd)** | Laura Benanti | Supergirl | CBS | Alura In-Ze / General Astra |
| 2015 **(42nd)** | Steven Brand | Teen Wolf | MTV | Dr. Gabriel Valack |
| 2015 **(42nd)** | Victor Garber | The Flash | The CW | Dr. Martin Stein / Firestorm |
| 2015 **(42nd)** | Scott Glenn | Daredevil | Netflix | Stick |
| 2015 **(42nd)** | Alex Kingston | Doctor Who: The Husbands of River Song | BBC America | River Song |
| 2015 **(42nd)** | John Carroll Lynch | The Walking Dead | AMC | Eastman |
| 2016 **(43rd)** | **Jeffrey Dean Morgan** | **The Walking Dead** | **AMC** | **Negan** |
| 2016 **(43rd)** | Ian Bohen | Teen Wolf | MTV | Peter Hale |
| 2016 **(43rd)** | Tyler Hoechlin | Supergirl | The CW | Clark Kent / Superman |
| 2016 **(43rd)** | Anthony Hopkins | Westworld | HBO | Dr. Robert Ford |
| 2016 **(43rd)** | Leslie Jordan | American Horror Story: Roanoke | FX | Ashley Gilbert / Cricket Marlowe |
| 2016 **(43rd)** | Dominique Pinon | Outlander | Starz | Master Raymond |
| 2017 **(44th)** | **David Lynch** | **Twin Peaks: The Return** | **Showtime** | **FBI Deputy Director Gordon Cole** |
| 2017 **(44th)** | Bryan Cranston | Philip K. Dick's Electric Dreams | Amazon | Silas Herrick |
| 2017 **(44th)** | Michael Greyeyes | Fear the Walking Dead | AMC | Qaletqa Walker |
| 2017 **(44th)** | Jeffrey Dean Morgan | The Walking Dead | AMC | Negan |
| 2017 **(44th)** | Rachel Nichols | The Librarians | TNT | Nicole Noone |
| 2017 **(44th)** | Jesse Plemons | Black Mirror | Netflix | Robert Daly |
| 2017 **(44th)** | Hartley Sawyer | The Flash | The CW | Ralph Dibny / Elongated Man |
| 2017 **(44th)** | Michelle Yeoh | Star Trek: Discovery | CBS All Access | Captain Philippa Georgiou / Emperor Georgiou |
| 2018/2019 **(45th)** | **Jeffrey Dean Morgan** | **The Walking Dead** | **AMC** | **Negan** |
| 2018/2019 **(45th)** | Rainer Bock | Better Call Saul | AMC | Werner Ziegler |
| 2018/2019 **(45th)** | Jon Cryer | Supergirl | The CW | Lex Luthor |
| 2018/2019 **(45th)** | Sydney Lemmon | Fear the Walking Dead | AMC | Isabelle |
| 2018/2019 **(45th)** | Tonya Pinkins | Fear the Walking Dead | AMC | Martha |
| 2018/2019 **(45th)** | Ed Speleers | Outlander | Starz | Stephen Bonnet |
| 2019/2020 **(46th)** | **Jon Cryer** | **Supergirl** | **The CW** | **Lex Luthor** |
| 2019/2020 **(46th)** | Giancarlo Esposito | The Mandalorian | Disney+ | Moff Gideon |
| 2019/2020 **(46th)** | Mark Hamill | What We Do in the Shadows | FX | Jim the Vampire |
| 2019/2020 **(46th)** | Jeffrey Dean Morgan | The Walking Dead | AMC | Negan |
| 2019/2020 **(46th)** | Kate Mulgrew | Mr. Mercedes | Audience | Alma Lane |
| 2019/2020 **(46th)** | Billy Porter | The Twilight Zone | CBS All Access | Keith |
| 2019/2020 **(46th)** | Jeri Ryan | Star Trek: Picard | CBS All Access | Seven of Nine |

=== 2020s ===
| Year | Actor / Actress | TV Series | Network | Character |
|---|---|---|---|---|
2021/2022 **(50th)**
| 2021/2022 **(50th)** | Network/Cable | | | |
| 2021/2022 **(50th)** | **Jennifer Tilly** | **Chucky** | **Syfy** | **Tiffany Valentine** |
| 2021/2022 **(50th)** | Michael Biehn | The Walking Dead | AMC | Ian |
| 2021/2022 **(50th)** | Rachael Harris | Ghosts | CBS | Sheryl |
| 2021/2022 **(50th)** | Jesse James Keitel | Big Sky | ABC | Jerrie Kennedy |
| 2021/2022 **(50th)** | Jeffrey Dean Morgan | The Walking Dead | AMC | Negan |
| 2021/2022 **(50th)** | Fisher Stevens | The Blacklist | NBC | Marvin Gerard |
| 2021/2022 **(50th)** | Aisha Tyler | Fear the Walking Dead | AMC | Mickey |
| 2021/2022 **(50th)** | Streaming | | | |
| 2021/2022 **(50th)** | **Hayden Christensen** | **Obi-Wan Kenobi** | **Disney+** | **Darth Vader** |
| 2021/2022 **(50th)** | Jensen Ackles | The Boys | Amazon Prime Video | Soldier Boy |
| 2021/2022 **(50th)** | LeVar Burton | Leverage: Redemption | Amazon Freevee | Robert Blanche |
| 2021/2022 **(50th)** | Rosario Dawson | The Mandalorian | Disney+ | Ahsoka Tano |
| 2021/2022 **(50th)** | Robert Englund | Stranger Things | Netflix | Victor Creel |
| 2021/2022 **(50th)** | Tony Dalton | Hawkeye | Disney+ | Jack Duquesne |
| 2021/2022 **(50th)** | Jonathan Majors | Loki | Disney+ | He Who Remains |
| 2022/2023 **(51st)** | **Paul Wesley** | **Star Trek: Strange New Worlds** | **Paramount+** | **Captain James T. Kirk** |
| 2022/2023 **(51st)** | Gael García Bernal | Werewolf by Night | Disney+ | Jack Russell / Werewolf by Night |
| 2022/2023 **(51st)** | Giancarlo Esposito | The Mandalorian | Disney+ | Moff Gideon |
| 2022/2023 **(51st)** | Nick Offerman | The Last of Us | HBO / Max | Bill |
| 2022/2023 **(51st)** | Amanda Plummer | Star Trek: Picard | Paramount+ | Captain Vadic |
| 2022/2023 **(51st)** | Andy Serkis | Andor | Disney+ | Kino Loy |
| 2022/2023 **(51st)** | Catherine Zeta-Jones | Wednesday | Netflix | Morticia Addams |
| 2023/2024 **(52nd)** | **Mark Hamill** | **The Fall of the House of Usher** | **Netflix** | **Arthur Gordon Pym** |
| 2023/2024 **(52nd)** | Matthew Jeffers | The Walking Dead: The Ones Who Live | AMC | Nat |
| 2023/2024 **(52nd)** | Martin Kove | Cobra Kai | Netflix | Sensei John Kreese |
| 2023/2024 **(52nd)** | Kyle MacLachlan | Fallout | Amazon Prime Video | Hank MacLean |
| 2023/2024 **(52nd)** | Andrea Martin | Evil | CBS | Sister Andrea |
| 2023/2024 **(52nd)** | Aubrey Plaza | Agatha All Along | Disney+ | Rio Vidal / Death |
| 2023/2024 **(52nd)** | Ke Huy Quan | Loki | Disney+ | Ouroboros "O.B." |
| 2024/2025 **(53rd)** | **David Dastmalchian** | **Dexter: Resurrection** | **Paramount+** | **Gareth Pike** |
| 2024/2025 **(53rd)** | Peter Dinklage | Dexter: Resurrection | Paramount+ | Leon Prater |
| 2024/2025 **(53rd)** | Linda Hamilton | Stranger Things | Netflix | Major General Dr. Kay |
| 2024/2025 **(53rd)** | James Remar | It: Welcome to Derry | HBO | Francis Shaw |
| 2024/2025 **(53rd)** | Samba Schutte | Pluribus | Apple TV+ | Koumba Diabaté |
| 2024/2025 **(53rd)** | Bill Skarsgård | It: Welcome to Derry | HBO | Pennywise |
| 2024/2025 **(53rd)** | Paul Wesley | Star Trek: Strange New Worlds | Paramount+ | James T. Kirk |

== Multiple nominations ==
5 nominations

- Jeffrey Dean Morgan

3 nominations

- Giancarlo Esposito

2 nominations

- Jon Cryer
- Robert Forster
