= David Jenkins (television writer) =

American television writer and producer (born 1982)

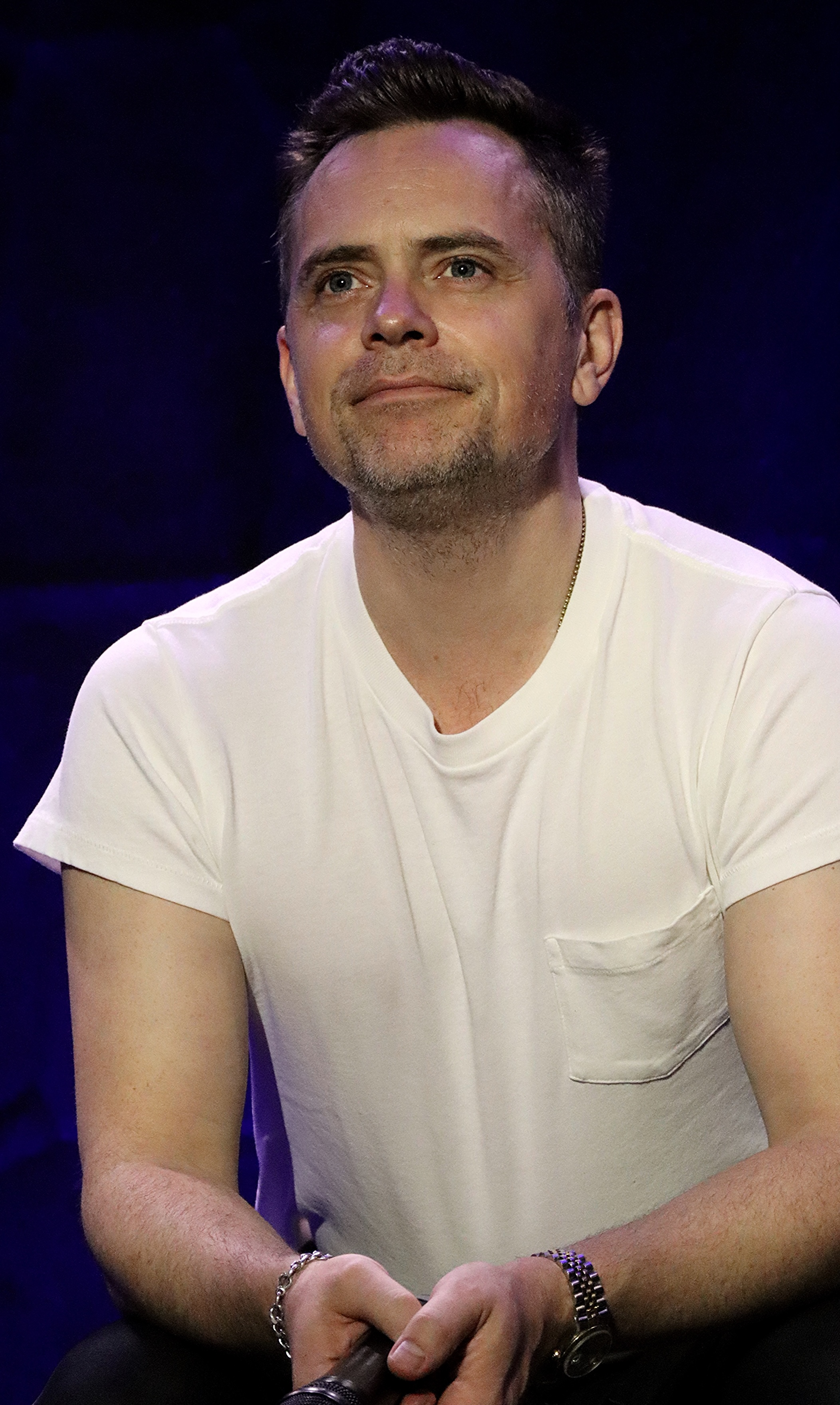
- Jenkins in 2025
- Born: October 8, 1982 (age 44); Minneapolis, Minnesota, U.S.
- Education: Boston University (BA); New York University (MFA)
- Occupations: Television writer, television producer
- Years active: 2016–present
- Television: Our Flag Means Death, People of Earth

David Jenkins is an American television writer, producer, director, and showrunner. He created the sitcoms Our Flag Means Death for HBO Max and People of Earth for TBS.

== Life and career ==
Jenkins was born in Minneapolis and grew up in the suburbs of Chicago. He attended Lake Forest High School in Lake Forest, Illinois. He went to Boston University for his undergraduate studies and received a degree in philosophy and political science. He received an MFA in Acting from NYU where he was awarded the Paul Walker Scholarship. While working as an actor in New York, Chicago, and at revered institutions such as Yale Rep and San Francisco's ACT, Jenkins began writing plays. He was a founding member of a theater company called "Human Animals" through which he could produce his own work. "Human Animals is a theater company dedicated to the exploration of the idiosyncrasies of the Human Animal," explained a press release. Later on, Jenkins explained that the company was a way for him to get off the ground as a new writer, "It was a way to produce. I'm the only playwright. We would produce my work, and then self-produce some with some friends. I kind of feel like no one's going to do your work when you're starting to do this because no one really knows what you're doing. Especially if you're doing something kind of different!"

== Plays ==
Jenkins' plays include middlemen, Post Office, Laissez-Faire, and Small Claims. Post Office was named one of the top 10 off-Broadway shows of 2011 by Paper magazine. His first play, middlemen, received international acclaim and has been produced in Chile and Norway after debuting with his company, Human Animals, where it was directed by his future wife, Josie. His works were typically slice-of-life, workplace driven comedy confronting relevant societal themes.

Jenkins worked with Page 73 for several years – in the Interstate 73 Writers Group in 2013 and as a Summer Resident in 2014. He was also a finalist for their Fellowship in 2013 and 2014.

== Television ==
Jenkins created and wrote TBS science fiction comedy series People of Earth, which ran for 2 seasons from 2016-17. He wrote the pilot for People of Earth (originally titled The Group) with Wyatt Cenac in mind.

In 2020, HBO Max greenlit Jenkins' queer pirate workplace rom-com, Our Flag Means Death. Jenkins served as creator, showrunner, writer, and guest actor for the series' first season. He was inspired to create the show after a conversation with his ex-wife led him to the Wikipedia pages of real-life pirates Stede Bonnet and Blackbeard, who were written to have sailed together. "Just the idea of somebody who has a terrible midlife crisis and decides to do this, and then really hurts his family and hurts his wife and hurts his kids, and we don't know why. It's lost to history. And then the world's greatest pirate takes him under his wing, and then they have a whole voyage together, and we don't know why. It's lost to history. So all of his facts are fascinating, and then all of the questions that are unanswered are fascinating," Jenkins explained in an interview.

The series premiered in March 2022 and received instant acclaim. Viewers were drawn to the show's unique charm that subverted the genre and defied people's expectations of queerbaiting in media by depicting multiple canonically queer couples. They instantly took to social media, generating a large fandom around Jenkins' work. The show continued to gain momentum after its release, staying at the top of the charts for most in-demand series seven weeks in a row, surpassing large franchises like Marvel and Star Wars.

In June 2022, HBO Max announced that the series had been renewed for a second season. Jenkins directed the first episode in addition to his existing duties. The second season premiered in October 2023 and quickly became a top show on the newly renamed Max service. In an interview with The Wall Street Journal, Jenkins revealed that the second season’s budget had been slashed by 40% due to companywide cutbacks at Warner Bros. Discovery. Despite its success, Our Flag Means Death was canceled after two seasons in January 2024. A fan-led renewal campaign was launched in response to the cancellation as Jenkins attempted to shop the series to other streamers. In March 2024, Jenkins announced that the series was unable to find a new home due to volatility in the streaming industry. Jenkins stated he remains open to selling the series and will never rule out its return.

In July 2025, Jenkins was tapped to write the pilot episode for HBO Max's Booster Gold series. Jenkins replaced Danny McBride, who was originally attached to write the script. However, in July 2026, Jenkins revealed he was no longer attached to the project and a new creative team would be taking over.

=== Accolades ===
Year	Award	Category	Nominee(s)	Result	Ref.
2022
2022	Nebula Awards	Ray Bradbury Nebula Award for Outstanding Dramatic Presentation	Our Flag Means Death	Nominated	
2022	Peabody Awards	Entertainment	Our Flag Means Death	Nominated	
