= Sunnyside (American TV series) =

American comedy television series

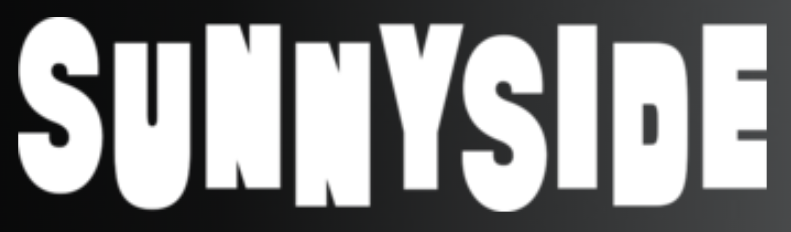
- Genre: Sitcom
- Created by: Kal Penn; Matt Murray
- Starring: Kal Penn; Diana-Maria Riva; Joel Kim Booster; Kiran Deol; Poppy Liu; Moses Storm; Samba Schutte
- Composer: Siddhartha Khosla
- Country of origin: United States
- Original language: English
- No. of seasons: 1
- No. of episodes: 11

Production
- Executive producers: Kal Penn; Matt Murray; Michael Schur; David Miner; Dan Spilo
- Production location: New York City
- Camera setup: Single-camera
- Running time: 25 minutes
- Production companies: Panther Co.; Fremulon; 3 Arts Entertainment; Universal Television

Original release
- Network: NBC
- Release: September 26 – October 17, 2019
- Network: NBC app/NBC.com
- Release: October 24 – December 5, 2019

Sunnyside is an American television sitcom created by Kal Penn and Matt Murray. The series premiered on September 26, 2019, on NBC. The series is produced by Panther Co., Fremulon, and 3 Arts Entertainment in association with Universal Television, with Penn and Murray serving as showrunners. On October 15, 2019, it was announced that NBC had pulled further episodes of the series from the air, and that the eleventh and final season of Will & Grace, initially held for midseason, premiered in its timeslot. It was the first network television cancellation of the 2019–20 television season with the show being pulled from NBC's prime-time schedule and remaining episodes have been released online on the NBC app/NBC.com and other video on-demand platforms. The series was later canceled on June 15, 2020.

== Premise ==
Set in Sunnyside, Queens in New York City, the series follows Garrett Modi, a fictional former New York City Councilman, who finds his calling when faced with immigrants in need of his help and in search of the American Dream.

== Cast ==
=== Main ===
- Kal Penn as Garrett Modi (named for Edna Garrett), a self-absorbed former city councilman removed from office after being charged with bribing a police officer. He now helps a group of immigrants receive permanent legal status in the United States while trying to improve himself as a person.
- Diana-Maria Riva as Griselda, a Dominican immigrant, married to a U.S. citizen. A running joke is that she works an unreasonable number of jobs, often in seemingly random places.
- Poppy Liu as Mei Lin, a member of a wealthy Asian family, on an EB-5 visa, seeking U.S. citizenship.
- Joel Kim Booster as Jun Ho, Mei Lin's brother, also on an EB-5 visa and seeking U.S. citizenship.
- Moses Storm as Bojan/Brady, born in Moldova and brought to the U.S. by his parents at age 2, enrolled in Deferred Action for Childhood Arrivals, seeking legal status in the U.S.
- Samba Schutte as Hakim, an Ethiopian immigrant, formerly a cardiothoracic surgeon in Ethiopia and currently a taxicab driver because he is not licensed to practice medicine in the U.S.
- Kiran Deol as Mallory Modi (named for Mallory Keaton), Garrett's sister, a successful doctor.

=== Recurring ===
- Ana Villafañe as Diana Barea, the idealistic, competent councilwoman elected to replace Garrett.
- Tudor Petrut as Drazen Barbu, an amateur DJ and immigrant from Moldova.
- Nick Gracer as Stanislav, a Moldovan immigrant and owner of a corner store who's known Brady since he was a child.

=== Guest ===
- John Michael Higgins as Wallace Furley, a professional con artist posing as an immigration lawyer ("The Ethiopian Executioner").
- Beck Bennett as Tripp Henson, a cable news host and old friend of Garrett's who spars with Diana ("Schnorf Town").
- Fortune Feimster as Michelle Pinholster, Griselda's wife ("Pants Full of Sandwiches").
- Natalie Morales as Celeste, Garrett's ex-girlfriend ("Pants Full of Sandwiches").

== Episodes ==
Season	Episodes		Originally released		
Season	Episodes		First released	Last released	Network
1	11	4	September 26, 2019	October 17, 2019	NBC
1	11	7	October 24, 2019	December 5, 2019	NBC app/NBC.com

=== Season 1 (2019) ===
No. overall	No. in season	Title	Directed by	Written by	Original air/release date	U.S. viewers (millions)
Broadcast
1	1	"Pilot"	Oz Rodriguez	Kal Penn & Matt Murray	September 26, 2019	1.77
Fast-talking former councilman Garrett Modi is ejected from his office by his successor Diana Barea, moves in with his sister, and turns to making humiliating paid appearances to support himself. Just when it seems he can't sink any lower, a group of immigrants -- Brady, Griselda, Hakim, Drazen, and siblings Jun Ho and Mei Lin -- pay him to find someone to help them finish their citizenship classes. Garrett lies, saying that he has connections, and offers to act as a substitute instructor; secretly, he hopes to use the group as a launching pad for his political comeback. Drazen is arrested by ICE, and Garrett's scheme is exposed, causing the group to abandon him in disgust. Riddled with guilt, Garrett rounds them up and goes to see Diana, who agrees to help find Drazen. Garrett then sets up a classroom in his sister's apartment, vowing to stay with the group until they become citizens.
2	2	"The Ethiopian Executioner"	Oz Rodriguez	Amy Hubbs	October 3, 2019	1.25
Garrett and Griselda discover that Hakim has been secretly giving money to a man claiming to be an immigration attorney so he can get a visa for his sister. Furious that one of his students is getting scammed, Garrett goes to confront the conman only to be easily misled and giving the thief time to clear out his office. Griselda then comes up with the idea of entrapping the fake attorney by pretending to need a visa for her mother, but Hakim spoils the plan. The thief, believing that his secret's safe, admits to stealing, which Hakim records with a hidden camera and uses to blackmail him into returning his money. Brady convinces Jun Ho and Mei Lin that he's their friend so he can mooch off their wealth, but when the siblings reveal that they consider him their only real friend, he decides to help them learn to enjoy life without having to spend so much money.
3	3	"Dr. Potato"	Heather Jack	Dan Klein	October 10, 2019	1.18
Diana agrees to help Garrett in his bid to get Drazen released from custody, taking Griselda, Jun Ho, and Mei Lin to see him at the detention center while Garrett and the others try to locate his family. A friend of Brady's introduces them to Drazen's wife Lyudmila, who is in hiding; Garrett arranges for her to stay with Mallory for the day. While waiting in line, Griselda tires of the siblings' whiny and immature behavior, and when she realizes that they don't know how to act like adults, she decides to act as a mother figure to them. Diana is thrown out for disruptive behavior, leaving Garrett with the burden of having to act as Drazen's character witness at his bond hearing. Despite his impassioned plea, Drazen is not released. However, Diana is able to get a lawyer to represent him, and informs the group that he will be held indefinitely rather than face deportation.
4	4	"Mondale"	Maggie Carey	Evan Waite	October 17, 2019	1.20
Jun Ho and Mei Lin are informed that their father is sending someone to check on their "business", which they set up to comply with their visas. Fearful of upsetting him, they ask Garrett for help setting up a fake company to fool the observer. Griselda's son Erik, an aspiring actor, gets her to loan him all of her savings to pay for a staging of his Hamilton rip-off, Mondale. Hakim and Brady intervene, and Erik cancels the performance, leading Griselda to scold them as she feels her son deserves to pursue whatever career he wants, even if she has to make sacrifices. The siblings learn that their father does not consider them worthy of his time, and Garrett stands up for them; the siblings then imprint on him as their real "father". Erik stages his musical with Hakim's help and donates the small profit of $45 he made to his mother to repay her.
Online
5	5	"Schnorf Town"	Paymen Benz	Damir Konjicija & Dario Konjicija	October 24, 2019	N/A
Diana makes her cable news debut to promote an affordable housing bill, only to get shouted down and humiliated by the show's host, Tripp Henson (Beck Bennett). Garrett offers to give her pointers on how to "play the game", but Diana refuses to stoop down to Tripp's level and Garrett subsequently makes things worse when Tripp falsely claims that he endorsed the bill, sinking its chances of passing for good. Hakim and Brady set up an illegal clinic in a bodega to treat low-income patients, but Mallory shuts them down when a pregnant woman comes in for her baby's birth. Diana and Garrett make a joint appearance on Tripp's show; Garrett lets her tear into him in order to throw Tripp off his game, resulting in the bill getting a second life as the council decides to give it a floor vote. Mallory tells Hakim she's willing to write him a recommendation for the residency he needs to be certified as a doctor.
6	6	"Skirt-Skirt!"	Jay Karas	Polina Diaz	October 31, 2019	N/A
Alone on Halloween, Garrett convinces the group to hold a party at their local bar, Viola's. He also invites three of his old friends from his days on the City Council, hoping to persuade them to finance his political aspirations. While planning the party, Jun Ho and Mei Lin have their first argument as siblings, resulting in both of them latching on to Griselda and Brady respectively as a replacement for the other. Garrett tries to impress his friends, ignoring Hakim's concerns that they don't respect him at all. When they decide to leave, he asks them whether they would still be friends if he didn't have connections for them to exploit, and learns they wouldn't. The siblings engage in an extremely sexualized dance battle to settle their disagreement, and make amends. Garrett accepts that Hakim and the others are his real friends.
7	7	"Pants Full of Sandwiches"	Jeff Blitz	Paiman Kalayeh	November 7, 2019	N/A
Garrett attempts to win back his ex, Celeste (Natalie Morales), but when she rejects him, he gets drunk and inadvertently drives a wedge between Griselda and her wife Michelle (Fortune Feimster) on the eve of an important interview for the former's green card. Jun Ho and Mei Lin are informed that their father's assets have been seized, leaving them bankrupt. Brady offers to teach them how to obtain free food and drinks, but Mei Lin confesses that she in fact has money stashed away and intends to teach Jun Ho a lesson about frivolous spending. A conversation with Celeste causes Garrett to realize how his unwillingness to be open with her ruined their relationship, and he intervenes to fix Griselda's marriage in time for the interview. Jun Ho discovers his sister's deception, but admits that the experience has taught him the importance of saving even though they are now rich again.
8	8	"Too Many Lumpies"	Linda Mendoza	Ayo Edebiri	November 14, 2019	N/A
Garrett and Mallory volunteer to host Thanksgiving for their parents. Garrett brings in the group to help, and Hakim gets to visit his first supermarket with Brady, who is starving himself for the turkey. When their parents arrive, an argument breaks out when Garrett realizes that they have never truly believed in him and Mallory accuses them of conditioning her to work too hard so everything is perfect. Upset, the parents leave and Mallory winds up serving an uncooked dinner to Garrett and the group. Griselda throws her shoes at the two and chastises them for casting blame. Garrett and Mallory realize they have to apologize and track their parents to an Olive Garden, where Garrett learns his parents simply didn't want to make him miserable by harshly disciplining him and Mallory accepts that she is the one working herself too hard. Amends are made, and everyone returns to Mallory's apartment for a proper Thanksgiving meal.
9	9	"Sigma Triangle Squiggly Thing"	David Miller	Andy Gosche	November 21, 2019	N/A
10	10	"I Don't Know Her"	Anya Adams	April Quioh	November 28, 2019	N/A
11	11	"Multicultural Tube of Meat"	Rebecca Asher	Aseem Batra	December 5, 2019	N/A

== Production ==
=== Development ===
On January 28, 2019, it was announced that NBC had given the production a pilot order. The pilot was written by Kal Penn who executive produces alongside Matt Murray, Michael Schur, David Miner and Dan Spilo. Production companies involved with the pilot include 3 Arts Entertainment and Universal Television. In March 2019, the pilot project was titled Sunnyside. On May 6, 2019, it was announced that the production had been given a series order, together with Bluff City Law. A day after that, it was announced that the series would premiere in the fall of 2019 and air on Thursday night entry in the 2019–2020 television season at 9:30 p.m. The series made its debut on September 26, 2019. While a few exterior scenes were filmed in the neighborhood in Queens, the series was primarily filmed in California at Universal Studios Hollywood.

=== Casting ===
In March 2019, it was announced that seven co-leads opposite Kal Penn, including Kiran Deol, Moses Storm, Diana Maria Riva, Samba Schutte, Poppy Liu, Joel Kim Booster and Tudor Petrut had been cast in the pilot's lead roles.

== Release ==
On May 12, 2019, NBC released the first official trailer for the series. The show is available for digital purchase on Youtube. The series aired on Sky Comedy in the U.K.

== Reception ==
On review aggregation website Rotten Tomatoes, the series holds an approval rating of 36% with an average rating of 5.33/10, based on 11 reviews. The website's critical consensus reads, "Though it has many of the right ingredients—like a superb cast and timely subject matter,—Sunnyside can't quite bring them together in a satisfying way, settling for broad comedy over the specific insights that its subject matter craves." Metacritic, which uses a weighted average, assigned the series a score of 58 out of 100 based on 8 critics, indicating "mixed or average reviews".

Penn later endorsed Jimmy Van Bramer, the real life council member representing Sunnyside, in a race for Queens Borough president.

== Cancellation ==
On October 15, 2019, NBC removed Sunnyside from its broadcast schedule, due to low ratings. NBC ordered an eleventh episode of Sunnyside, and the final seven episodes were released on digital platforms. Will & Grace replaced Sunnyside on the broadcast schedule. The series was later canceled on June 15, 2020.
