= People of Earth =

2016 American science fiction television series

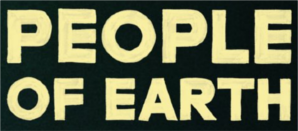
- Genre: Sitcom; Comic science fiction
- Created by: David Jenkins
- Starring: Wyatt Cenac; Ana Gasteyer; Oscar Nuñez; Michael Cassidy; Alice Wetterlund; Luka Jones; Brian Huskey; Nancy Lenehan; Tracee Chimo; Da'Vine Joy Randolph; Björn Gustafsson; Ken Hall; Nasim Pedrad
- Composer: Mark Mothersbaugh
- Country of origin: United States
- Original language: English
- No. of seasons: 2
- No. of episodes: 20

Production
- Executive producers: Greg Daniels; David Jenkins; Conan O'Brien; Norm Hiscock
- Producer: Paula Devonshire
- Camera setup: Single-camera
- Production companies: Deedle-Dee Productions; Conaco; Warner Horizon Television

Original release
- Network: TBS
- Release: October 31, 2016 – September 25, 2017

People of Earth is an American science fiction sitcom television series created by David Jenkins about a support group for alien abductees, as well as the aliens who had abducted them. TBS ordered the pilot under the name The Group in May 2015, and announced a 10-episode order in January 2016. The series premiered on October 31, 2016, on TBS. On September 13, 2017, TBS renewed the series for a third season, but on June 9, 2018, they reversed the decision and canceled the series with season 3 already written.

== Plot ==
The series follows city journalist Ozzie Graham (Wyatt Cenac), who travels to Beacon, New York to write a piece on a support group called "StarCrossed", who are survivors of alien encounters. Although skeptical at first, Ozzie realizes the truth of the group's claims when he begins to recall similar experiences. Ozzie eventually quits his job and moves to Beacon to further investigate the town's strange occurrences, as well as resolve issues in his past related to his possible abduction.

As the series progresses, Ozzie gradually learns that his employer, Jonathan Walsh, is a reptilian in disguise. Jonathan, who has considered him a friend since he abducted the young Ozzie, explains that the Trinity Federation, an alliance among three races of extraterrestrials (greys, whites, and reptilians), was sent many years ago to conquer Earth under reptilian leadership. However, in his time on Earth, Jonathan has developed sympathy for humans and wants to expose the truth about the invasion, so he hopes to persuade his alien coworkers and the humans he calls friends to help.

== Cast ==
=== "StarCrossed" members ===
A support group for "experiencers" – the term they prefer to abductees.

- Wyatt Cenac as Ozzie Graham, a reporter who travels to Beacon to investigate StarCrossed, then joins them upon realizing that he, too, is an experiencer
  - Aaron Davis as young Ozzie
- Ana Gasteyer as Gina Morrison, a therapist
- Luka Jones as Gerry Johnson, a toll booth attendant who is passionate about aliens
- Brian Huskey as Richard Eugene Clancy Schultz, VP of a tech company that makes terminators for ethernet cables
- Alice Wetterlund as Kelly Grady, a temp receptionist at a funeral home
- Da'Vine Joy Randolph as Yvonne Watson, a postal worker
- Tracee Chimo as Chelsea Wheeler, a homemaker
- Daniel Stewart Sherman as Ennis Hart, a farmer
- Nancy Lenehan as Margaret Flood, a retiree
- Nasim Pedrad as Agent Alex Foster/Crystal, an FBI agent who was abducted as a baby
  - Pedrad also plays Jasmine, Foster's twin sister

=== Aliens ===
- Ken Hall as Jeff, a grey working on the alien spaceship (the "Sub-Ship") as part of the Trinity Federation
- Björn Gustafsson as Don, a white working on the Sub-Ship
- Drew Nelson as Kurt, a reptilian working on the Sub-Ship
  - Nelson also voices the deer Ozzie hallucinates after his experience
- Michael Cassidy as Jonathan Walsh, a reptilian working on Earth as owner of the Glint media empire Ozzie works for
- Debra Lynne McCabe as Nancy, an android working as Jonathan's Earth assistant
- Victor Williams as Assessor, a reptilian and senior operative on Earth
- Peter Serafinowicz as Eric, a floating robotic cube from the Alpha Federation, who becomes the new boss on the Sub-Ship after a merger between the Alpha and Trinity Federations
- Ted Jefferies as Eric's guard
- Paul Lieberstein as Assessor, a reptilian assassin

=== Supporting characters ===
- Oscar Nuñez as Father Doug, the priest in charge of the church where StarCrossed meets, who renounces his priesthood to pursue a relationship with Chelsea
- Amy Landecker as Debbie Schultz, Richard's ex-wife
- Michael Crane as John Wheeler, Chelsea's husband
- H. Jon Benjamin as Officer Lance Glimmer, a police officer working for the aliens
- Kevin Hanchard as Agent Jim Saunders, an FBI agent working for the aliens, and Foster's superior
- Eddson Morales as Brian
- Sam Malkin as Glenn, Richard's neighbor
- Douglas Nyback as Todd, Richard's boss
- Michael Hitchcock as Leonard Bechdal

== Episodes ==
=== Series overview ===
Season	Episodes	Originally released	
Season	Episodes	First released	Last released
1	10	October 31, 2016	December 19, 2016
2	10	July 24, 2017	September 25, 2017

=== Season 1 (2016) ===
No. overall	No. in season	Title	Directed by	Written by	Original release date	Prod. code	US viewers (millions)
1	1	"Pilot"	Greg Daniels	David Jenkins	October 31, 2016	U11.10041	0.91
New York City reporter Ozzie Graham travels to Beacon, New York to do a story on StarCrossed, a support group for "experiencers", victims of alien abduction. Richard explains his theory that every president, for two centuries, has been a reptilian. While skeptical at first, Ozzie soon begins uncovering repressed memories of his own abduction experience.
2	2	"Sponsored By"	Andrew Gaynord	David Jenkins	October 31, 2016	U13.12402	0.79
Ozzie quits his New York City job for one in Beacon, but has some difficulty adjusting to his new life and his alien abduction. Ozzie tries to pick a sponsor at StarCrossed. Ozzie's former boss, Jonathan (a reptilian), tries to convince Ozzie to return to New York City. Jonathan has been using his Glint Enterprises media empire to control and cover-up stories about alien activity. Kurt, another reptilian, goes to Beacon dressed as a human to try and clean up the Ozzie mess, only to be killed in a hit and run by Gina, who was texting while driving. Beacon P.D. Officer Glimmer cleans up Kurt's body as its human disguise wears off.
3	3	"Acceptance"	Andrew Gaynord	Brigitte Munoz-Liebowitz	November 7, 2016	U13.12403	0.67
Ozzie tries to help Richard face the reality of his failed marriage—his wife is not a missing alien captive, she is simply divorcing him. She admits to being abducted with him, but their marriage was always bad and she still wants a divorce. Officer Glimmer tells Gina that she only hit a raccoon. Gerry and Yvonne investigate Gina's hit and run, figuring out that she hit a reptilian, whose acidic blood burned its shape into the pavement. Jonathan visits the Sub-Ship, the aliens' spaceship, to give Don (a kindhearted white alien) and Jeff (a stuffy, workaholic grey alien) the bad news about Kurt, which hits them both hard.
4	4	"Past, Present, and Future"	Ian Fitzgibbon	Emily Heller	November 14, 2016	U13.12404	0.67
Gina's backstory and the origin of StarCrossed is explored. Jonathan, in trouble with the rest of the alien team, tries to goad Ozzie (alien "Subject 28409") into leaving Beacon before he learns more about the aliens. Jeff is angry with Jonathan for getting Kurt killed. The Assessor reveals that the reptilians' agenda (consistent with Richard's theory about presidents) is "travelling light years to an inhabited planet, hiding among their dominant species for two centuries, and subverting them from within." Ozzie's flashbacks reveal that Jonathan visited him during his childhood, in both reptilian and human form.
5	5	"Unexplained"	Ian Fitzgibbon	Alyssa Lane & Alex Sherman	November 21, 2016	U13.12405	0.81
Chelsea and Father Doug grow close, when he helps her by explaining that "God makes us witnesses to the unexplainable" and that her acceptance of her impossible event (abduction) is a form of faith. Jeff sends signals that mess with the implant in Ozzie's brain, causing pain and hallucinations that lead to hospitalization. Doctors remove the implant just as Jeff tries to wipe Ozzie's brain. Don reminisces about his pleasant time with Kelly during her abduction, deciding to take a job at her favorite coffee shop to be closer to her.
6	6	"Significant Other"	Shaka King	Charla Lauriston	November 28, 2016	U13.12406	0.76
With Don working on Earth and Kurt dead, the aliens are months behind on their work. Jeff is stunned to receive a message that the alien MainStation spaceship is coming. Gina organizes a "coming out" for StarCrossed, who each bring a family member to the group meeting. The family members react horribly, but the StarCrossed members develop deeper bonds. Ozzie runs into Father Doug at a bar, leading to a night of drinking and bonding. Father Doug is struggling with the monotony of a small town congregation and his feelings for Chelsea. Ozzie keeps investigating Glint Enterprises.
7	7	"Last Day on Earth"	Shaka King	Norm Hiscock	December 5, 2016	U13.12407	0.82
Gerry's historical research tells him that an abduction will happen tonight, so he plans to be the next "experiencer". He finds the courage to tell Yvonne how he feels about her and she fully reciprocates – twice. Don and Kelly go out for drinks and dancing. The Assessor orders Jonathan to kill Ozzie, who is still digging into Glint Enterprises, worrying fellow reptilians Bono and Elon Musk. Jonathan, deeply attached to Ozzie since abducting him as a child, gives him proof of Glint Enterprises' coverups to publish in order to protect them both. Jeff is unable to do the (Gerry's) abduction without Don, who is on his date.
8	8	"Mars or Bust"	Rodman Flender	David Jenkins	December 12, 2016	U13.12408	0.76
Ozzie's exposé of Glint Enterprises leads to a job at the New York Times, but they back off after his abduction story is brought into the light. Jeff takes control of Nancy, has her leave Jonathan with no money, then has her join StarCrossed to ruin the group. Officer Glimmer has teenagers abduct and rough up Father Doug, twisting the results to convince Doug to kick StarCrossed out of the church basement. Ozzie salvages the offer from New York, but has another flashback to his childhood abduction when he stops at a particular store on the edge of Beacon. Jeff (through Nancy's eyes) recognizes Gina's car as Kurt's killer. Upset with this discovery, Jeff plans to take revenge on the car's driver.
9	9	"Lost and Found"	Rodman Flender	Nick Adams	December 19, 2016	U13.12409	0.776
Gerry, never abducted and upset that Yvonne doesn't want a relationship, quits the group and goes to work for his dad. When Richard flirts with Nancy, Jeff uses this to learn more about Gina, successfully dismantling StarCrossed from within. Ozzie's parents reveal that they lost him for 48 hours at the store in Beacon, after which he started drawing a reptilian. Father Doug takes a vacation and Chelsea realizes her husband is cheating – she goes to watch Doug's gig with his reunited band. Don is concerned that Jeff is off-mission in his use of Nancy, not realizing that Jeff is about to have Nancy kill Gina.
10	10	"Snake Man and Little Guy"	Greg Daniels	Alyssa Lane & Alex Sherman	December 19, 2016	U13.12410	0.683
Gina helps Ozzie come to terms with memories of his childhood abduction—one memory is revealed to be a young Gina on the alien ship. Ozzie and Gina visit the store in Beacon, and he recalls discovering Jonathan that day with two other reptilians (Kurt and Lewis the store clerk). Don tries to stop Jeff, who justifies that killing Ozzie and Gina now will save them from becoming slaves in ore mines when MainStation arrives. Don warns Jonathan, now living with Officer Glimmer, about Jeff's murderous plans using Nancy. When Jonathan stops Nancy, Jeff triggers her self-destruct—the resulting destruction allows Richard to see that Jonathan is a reptilian. Doug and Chelsea give in to their attraction and act on it fully. Don and Kelly give in to their attraction and leave for Iceland (his fake home). MainStation arrives, but Jeff is surprised when unknown beings, rather than his Commanders, emerge. It is revealed that Jonathan had all eight members of StarCrossed together on his ship decades ago, forming his deep personal connection with them as youngsters/young adults (Margaret). Gerry is finally abducted.

=== Season 2 (2017) ===
No. overall	No. in season	Title	Directed by	Written by	Original release date	Prod. code	US viewers (millions)
11	1	"New Beginnings"	Ian Fitzgibbon	David Jenkins	July 24, 2017	U13.12851	0.646
Ozzie, Gina, and Richard deal with the discovery that Jonathan is a reptilian and try to reorganize StarCrossed. Don tries to maintain his cover story with Kelly. Jeff tries to impress his new boss, a floating robotic cube named Eric, by showing off his latest abductee (Gerry).
12	2	"Uneasy Alliance"	Ian Fitzgibbon	David Jenkins	July 31, 2017	U13.12852	0.743
Agent Foster begins investigating StarCrossed to try and find Jonathan. Jeff worries that Eric is out to get him. Don and Kelly deal with the emotional fallout from their breakup.
13	3	"Gerry's Return"	Ian Fitzgibbon	Aaron Shure	August 7, 2017	U13.12853	0.723
Gerry returns to Beacon with no memory of his abduction but an idea for a board game, which he is compulsively driven to make by hallucinations of Eric. Doug and Chelsea consider advancing their relationship. Ozzie and Foster try to set up a meeting with Jonathan, only for him to go on the run.
14	4	"Always a Day Away"	Jennifer Celotta	Charla Lauriston	August 14, 2017	U13.12854	0.673
StarCrossed uses Gina's birthday party to distract Foster while Ozzie goes to meet Jonathan. Don tries to come clean to Kelly. Eric orders Jeff to clean out the room where Kurt's body is stored in a preservation chamber; but when Jeff kisses the body goodbye, he is shocked as Kurt miraculously returns to life.
15	5	"Why Can't We Be Friends"	Jennifer Celotta	Alyssa Lane & Alex Sherman	August 21, 2017	U13.12855	0.615
Blaming Jonathan for his being fired (actually due to negligence), Richard joins Foster in tracking down Ozzie's meeting with him. The meeting is ambushed by a reptilian hitman sent to track Jonathan down, with tragic results as Ozzie is shot and killed.
16	6	"Aftermath"	Ian Fitzgibbon	Brig Muñoz-Liebowitz	August 28, 2017	U13.12856	0.669
StarCrossed reels from Ozzie's death, while Alex is suspended from the FBI for refusing to change her official report regarding it. Jonathan returns to the ship, where he begins plotting with the others against Eric. The aliens then abduct Ozzie's casket and store his body in Kurt's preservation chamber.
17	7	"Bee Kind"	Ian Fitzgibbon	David Jenkins	September 4, 2017	U13.12857	0.666
StarCrossed goes to Alex for help in investigating Ozzie's death. Jeff and Kurt deal with a bee running loose on the ship, while Don recalls a previous abduction gone wrong that haunts him. Chelsea and Doug make a major decision regarding their relationship. Jonathan hunts down the hitman who killed Ozzie and takes revenge.
18	8	"Alien Experiencer Expo"	Shaka King	Nick Adams	September 11, 2017	U13.12858	0.707
StarCrossed go to an alien experiencers' expo, where Gina tries to get a book deal for Ozzie's story, Richard tries to finally convince Alex of the existence of aliens, and Chelsea realizes she's pregnant. Don tracks down Alex, the baby who was separated from her family during an abduction, at the convention to get some closure and secretly leaves her a note.
19	9	"Truth or Dare"	Shaka King	Samantha McIntyre	September 18, 2017	U13.12859	0.688
Richard goes to court to get his job back. Gina psychologically prepares Alex to follow a lead on her long lost family: a phone number Don secretly left her. Jonathan tries to get Jeff to confess his feelings to Kurt while the Sub-Ship crew prepares to mutiny against Eric, who is making his own move against StarCrossed.
20	10	"Game Night"	Shaka King	Alyssa Lane & Alex Sherman	September 25, 2017	U13.12860	N/A
Alex reunites with her long-lost twin sister. Jonathan, Jeff, Don, and Kurt launch their mutiny against Eric, who reveals his plan to eliminate StarCrossed by manipulating Gerry into setting up a poisonous trap disguised as a board game. Jonathan barely stops Gerry from releasing the toxins in time, and ends up arrested by Alex, whom he finally convinces of the truth about aliens. Eric escapes and takes control of Don's body; using it, he banishes Jeff and Kurt (who is, yet again, run over and killed) to Earth and abducts StarCrossed.

== Production ==
TBS first began developing the show in May 2015 and was going by The Group as its working title at the time. The final title "People Of Earth" is derived from classic sci-fi media: in the 1956 film Earth vs the Flying Saucers, conquering aliens first address humans with the phrase, "People of Earth. Attention!"

The pilot was ordered to series with a 10-episode order by TBS in January 2016. It was directed by Greg Daniels and shot in Toronto, Ontario, Canada.

== Reception ==
People of Earth has received mostly positive reviews from television critics. The review aggregator website Rotten Tomatoes gives the first season an approval rating of 89%, based on 27 reviews, with an average rating of 7.30/10. The site's critical consensus reads: "People of Earth skillfully grounds its high-concept premise with a strong story, quirky humor, and sweetly relatable humanity." On Metacritic, the first season has a score of 72 out of 100, based on reviews from 20 critics, indicating "Generally favorable reviews". The second season on Metacritic has a score of 76 out of 100, based on reviews from 20 critics, also indicating "Generally favorable reviews".

Mike Hale of The New York Times gave it a positive review, writing: "People of Earth provides a funny line or detail just often enough to keep you watching." Maureen Ryan of Variety also praised the series, declaring "People of Earth may be slight and decidedly modest in its ambitions and execution, but it's not a show that sets out to mock or belittle unconventional people." The Hollywood Reporter's Tim Goodman said People of Earth was "easily one of the best comedies on television."
