= Samba Schutte =

Dutch-Mauritanian actor and comedian

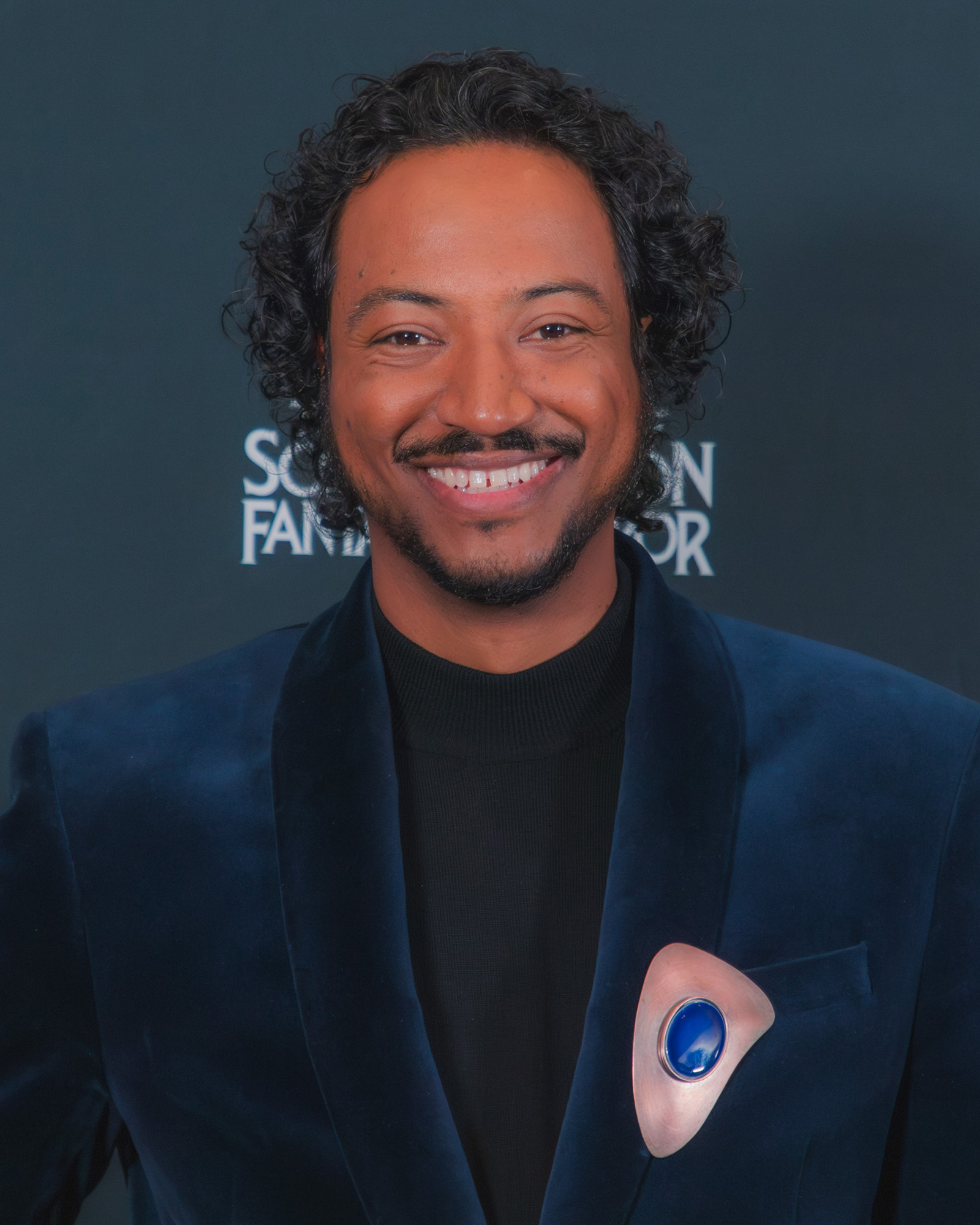
- Samba Schutte in 2026
- Born: Nouakchott, Mauritania
- Education: Utrecht School of the Arts
- Occupations: Actor; comedian; writer
- Years active: 2007–present
- Known for: Our Flag Means Death, Sunnyside, Pluribus

Samba Dirk-Jan Schutte is a Mauritanian-Dutch actor, comedian, and writer. He is known for his role as Roach in the series Our Flag Means Death and for portraying Hakim in Sunnyside, the first Ethiopian character in an American sitcom. He also stars in the 2025 American sci-fi series Pluribus.

== Early life and education ==
Samba Dirk-Jan Schutte was born in Nouakchott, Mauritania, to a Mauritanian Muslim mother and a Dutch Christian father. At the age of two, he relocated to Ethiopia when his father began working for a non-governmental organization.

He was educated at the Sandford International School in Addis Ababa. His interest in acting was sparked at age 12 after playing the video game Steven Spielberg's Director's Chair. In 2001, he moved to the Netherlands to study theatre at the Utrecht School of the Arts.

== Career ==
=== Early career in the Netherlands ===
Schutte began performing stand-up comedy in Dutch clubs in 2004, later joining the comedy collective Comedy Explosion. In 2006, he won both the Jury and Audience Awards at the Leids Cabaret Festival, leading to several years of national touring. He also worked as a writer and presenter for the Dutch adaptation of The Daily Show, titled De Nieuwste Show.

=== United States ===
In 2011, Schutte moved to Los Angeles on an O-1 visa for "Aliens of Extraordinary Ability." Shortly after arriving, he won a competition at The Comedy Store and became a regular performer there. He broke into American film with a role in the 2016 comedy The Tiger Hunter.

His breakthrough television role came in 2019 when he was cast as Hakim, an Ethiopian heart surgeon driving a taxi in New York City, in the NBC sitcom Sunnyside. Schutte connected deeply with the role, drawing on his own immigrant experience. Schutte gained wider recognition for his role as the ship's cook Roach in the acclaimed HBO Max series Our Flag Means Death (2022–2023).

He has established a prolific voice-acting career, with roles in animated series such as The Legend of Vox Machina, Jurassic World: Chaos Theory, and Monster High. He also performed voice work for the video game Call of Duty: Black Ops 6 (2024).

In 2025, he appeared as Koumba Diabaté in the Apple TV science fiction series Pluribus.

== Personal life ==
Schutte is multilingual, fluent in English, French, Dutch, and Amharic. He has vitiligo, a skin pigmentation condition, which he has spoken about managing after initial fears it would impact his career. He met his wife, a film producer, in Los Angeles.

== Filmography ==
=== Film ===
Year	Title	Role	Notes
2007	Hakili Jambar	Samba	
2009	De multi culti story	Mohammed	
2011	The Wedding Night	Hussain	
2012	I Think My Facebook Friend Is Dead	Rishi Rao	
2012	Middle of Nowhere	JuJu Club Dancer	Uncredited
2012	Daylight Savings	Party Guest	
2012	Genesis: Cain & Abel	Cain	
2012	Noobz	Sports Bar Fan	
2012	Comrades	Neil Armstrong Singh	
2013	The Truth About Emanuel	Man on Train	Uncredited
2013	Haleema	Janjaweed Green Scarf	
2013	Jaded the Series	Martin	
2015	Separated	Samba	
2016	Buddy Solitaire	Arash	
2016	The Tiger Hunter	Kareem	
2017	Je Maintiendrai	Samba	
2020	She's in Portland	Steve	
2023	Advanced Chemistry	Allen	
TBA	Scapegoat		

=== Television ===
Year	Title	Role	Notes
2012	The Grind	Samba	
2012	Fatal Encounters	Rais Bhuiyan	
2012	Chronicles of the Dead		
2013	Buni TV Comedy Series	Dr. Mukakaka / Samba / Jazel Shah	
2015	Uitzonderlijk Vervoer	Samba	
2015	Borderline	Brian	
2018	Stellar Hosts	Doug	
2019	Sunnyside	Hakim	8 episodes
2021	9-1-1	Saleh	Episode: "What's Your Fantasy?"
2022	Santiago of the Seas	Balthazar (voice)	2 episodes
2022–2023	Our Flag Means Death	Roach	16 episodes
2024	The Legend of Vox Machina	Various voices	2 episodes
2024	Jurassic World: Chaos Theory	Ousmane Mballo (voice)	4 episodes
2024	Monster High	Hemming (voice)	3 episodes
2025	Pluribus	Koumba Diabaté	Main role

=== Video games ===
Year	Title	Voice role	Notes
2024	Call of Duty: Black Ops 6	Yannik	

== Accolades ==
Year	Award	Category	Nominated Work	Result	Ref.
2022	Peabody Awards	Entertainment	Our Flag Means Death	Nominated	
2026	Saturn Awards	Best Guest Star in a Television Series	Pluribus	Nominated	
