= Tijuana (TV series) =

Mexican Spanish-language crime TV series on Netflix

- Genre: Crime
- Created by: Zayre Ferrer; Daniel Posada
- Starring: Damián Alcázar; Tamara Vallarta; Rolf Petersen
- Country of origin: Mexico
- Original language: Spanish
- No. of seasons: 1
- No. of episodes: 11

Original release
- Network: Netflix
- Release: 5 April 2019

Tijuana is a Mexican Spanish-language crime television series created by Zayre Ferrer and Daniel Posada and starring Damián Alcázar, Tamara Vallarta and Rolf Petersen. The plot revolves around journalists in Mexico investigating Eugenio Robles's (Roberto Mateos) death and how it connects to Greorgio Mueller (Rodrigo Abed). The story is told with the reality of life in current-day Mexico as a backdrop, the world's most dangerous place for journalists.

It is a co-production between Netflix and the American Spanish-language free-to-air TV station Univision, and was ordered direct-to-series. The first season premiered on Netflix streaming and Univision on April 5, 2019.

== Cast ==
- Damián Alcázar as Antonio Borja
- Tamara Vallarta as Gabriela Cisneros
- Rolf Petersen as Lalo
- Claudette Maillé as Federica
- Tete Espinoza as Malu
- Iván Aragón as Andrés Borja
- Rodrigo Abed as G. Mueller
- Martha Claudia Moreno as Lucía Torres
- Eden Villavicencio as Mejia
- Giancarlo Ruiz as Julian Sabines
- Andrés Delgado as Daniel Muller

== Release ==
The full first season consisting of 11 episodes premiered on Netflix streaming on April 5, 2019.
